

299001–299100 

|-bgcolor=#fefefe
| 299001 ||  || — || December 10, 2004 || Socorro || LINEAR || NYS || align=right | 1.1 km || 
|-id=002 bgcolor=#fefefe
| 299002 ||  || — || December 9, 2004 || Catalina || CSS || — || align=right data-sort-value="0.80" | 800 m || 
|-id=003 bgcolor=#d6d6d6
| 299003 ||  || — || December 9, 2004 || Catalina || CSS || SHU3:2 || align=right | 6.7 km || 
|-id=004 bgcolor=#fefefe
| 299004 ||  || — || December 9, 2004 || Kitt Peak || Spacewatch || — || align=right | 1.0 km || 
|-id=005 bgcolor=#fefefe
| 299005 ||  || — || December 11, 2004 || Socorro || LINEAR || — || align=right | 1.2 km || 
|-id=006 bgcolor=#E9E9E9
| 299006 ||  || — || December 11, 2004 || Kitt Peak || Spacewatch || GER || align=right | 2.7 km || 
|-id=007 bgcolor=#fefefe
| 299007 ||  || — || December 12, 2004 || Kitt Peak || Spacewatch || MAS || align=right data-sort-value="0.70" | 700 m || 
|-id=008 bgcolor=#fefefe
| 299008 ||  || — || December 10, 2004 || Socorro || LINEAR || EUT || align=right data-sort-value="0.86" | 860 m || 
|-id=009 bgcolor=#fefefe
| 299009 ||  || — || December 11, 2004 || Socorro || LINEAR || ERI || align=right | 2.1 km || 
|-id=010 bgcolor=#fefefe
| 299010 ||  || — || December 9, 2004 || Catalina || CSS || ERI || align=right | 1.5 km || 
|-id=011 bgcolor=#fefefe
| 299011 ||  || — || December 15, 2004 || Kitt Peak || Spacewatch || — || align=right | 1.2 km || 
|-id=012 bgcolor=#d6d6d6
| 299012 ||  || — || December 15, 2004 || Socorro || LINEAR || HIL || align=right | 7.3 km || 
|-id=013 bgcolor=#fefefe
| 299013 ||  || — || December 15, 2004 || Socorro || LINEAR || — || align=right data-sort-value="0.89" | 890 m || 
|-id=014 bgcolor=#fefefe
| 299014 ||  || — || December 9, 2004 || Kitt Peak || Spacewatch || V || align=right data-sort-value="0.89" | 890 m || 
|-id=015 bgcolor=#fefefe
| 299015 ||  || — || December 16, 2004 || Kitt Peak || Spacewatch || NYS || align=right data-sort-value="0.92" | 920 m || 
|-id=016 bgcolor=#fefefe
| 299016 ||  || — || December 16, 2004 || Kitt Peak || Spacewatch || NYS || align=right data-sort-value="0.78" | 780 m || 
|-id=017 bgcolor=#fefefe
| 299017 ||  || — || December 18, 2004 || Mount Lemmon || Mount Lemmon Survey || MAS || align=right data-sort-value="0.84" | 840 m || 
|-id=018 bgcolor=#fefefe
| 299018 ||  || — || December 18, 2004 || Mount Lemmon || Mount Lemmon Survey || MAS || align=right data-sort-value="0.82" | 820 m || 
|-id=019 bgcolor=#fefefe
| 299019 ||  || — || December 16, 2004 || Kitt Peak || Spacewatch || — || align=right data-sort-value="0.94" | 940 m || 
|-id=020 bgcolor=#E9E9E9
| 299020 Chennaoui ||  ||  || January 5, 2005 || Vicques || M. Ory || RAF || align=right | 1.2 km || 
|-id=021 bgcolor=#fefefe
| 299021 ||  || — || January 1, 2005 || Catalina || CSS || NYS || align=right data-sort-value="0.99" | 990 m || 
|-id=022 bgcolor=#E9E9E9
| 299022 ||  || — || January 6, 2005 || Catalina || CSS || — || align=right | 1.6 km || 
|-id=023 bgcolor=#fefefe
| 299023 ||  || — || January 7, 2005 || Socorro || LINEAR || — || align=right | 1.4 km || 
|-id=024 bgcolor=#E9E9E9
| 299024 ||  || — || January 6, 2005 || Socorro || LINEAR || — || align=right | 1.6 km || 
|-id=025 bgcolor=#E9E9E9
| 299025 ||  || — || January 6, 2005 || Socorro || LINEAR || RAF || align=right | 1.4 km || 
|-id=026 bgcolor=#fefefe
| 299026 ||  || — || January 6, 2005 || Socorro || LINEAR || — || align=right | 1.2 km || 
|-id=027 bgcolor=#fefefe
| 299027 ||  || — || January 7, 2005 || Socorro || LINEAR || — || align=right | 1.2 km || 
|-id=028 bgcolor=#fefefe
| 299028 ||  || — || January 13, 2005 || Mayhill || A. Lowe || MAS || align=right data-sort-value="0.98" | 980 m || 
|-id=029 bgcolor=#E9E9E9
| 299029 ||  || — || January 11, 2005 || Socorro || LINEAR || EUN || align=right | 1.7 km || 
|-id=030 bgcolor=#fefefe
| 299030 ||  || — || January 11, 2005 || Socorro || LINEAR || — || align=right | 1.3 km || 
|-id=031 bgcolor=#E9E9E9
| 299031 ||  || — || January 13, 2005 || Kitt Peak || Spacewatch || — || align=right | 1.2 km || 
|-id=032 bgcolor=#E9E9E9
| 299032 ||  || — || January 13, 2005 || Kitt Peak || Spacewatch || — || align=right | 2.8 km || 
|-id=033 bgcolor=#fefefe
| 299033 ||  || — || January 15, 2005 || Socorro || LINEAR || — || align=right | 1.2 km || 
|-id=034 bgcolor=#fefefe
| 299034 ||  || — || January 15, 2005 || Socorro || LINEAR || MAS || align=right data-sort-value="0.71" | 710 m || 
|-id=035 bgcolor=#fefefe
| 299035 ||  || — || January 13, 2005 || Catalina || CSS || — || align=right | 1.4 km || 
|-id=036 bgcolor=#fefefe
| 299036 ||  || — || January 13, 2005 || Kitt Peak || Spacewatch || V || align=right data-sort-value="0.87" | 870 m || 
|-id=037 bgcolor=#fefefe
| 299037 ||  || — || January 15, 2005 || Socorro || LINEAR || NYS || align=right data-sort-value="0.91" | 910 m || 
|-id=038 bgcolor=#fefefe
| 299038 ||  || — || January 15, 2005 || Socorro || LINEAR || NYS || align=right data-sort-value="0.88" | 880 m || 
|-id=039 bgcolor=#fefefe
| 299039 ||  || — || January 15, 2005 || Kitt Peak || Spacewatch || NYS || align=right data-sort-value="0.86" | 860 m || 
|-id=040 bgcolor=#fefefe
| 299040 ||  || — || January 13, 2005 || Kitt Peak || Spacewatch || NYS || align=right data-sort-value="0.59" | 590 m || 
|-id=041 bgcolor=#fefefe
| 299041 ||  || — || January 13, 2005 || Kitt Peak || Spacewatch || — || align=right | 1.5 km || 
|-id=042 bgcolor=#E9E9E9
| 299042 ||  || — || January 15, 2005 || Kitt Peak || Spacewatch || — || align=right | 1.3 km || 
|-id=043 bgcolor=#fefefe
| 299043 || 2005 BL || — || January 16, 2005 || Desert Eagle || W. K. Y. Yeung || V || align=right | 1.2 km || 
|-id=044 bgcolor=#E9E9E9
| 299044 ||  || — || January 16, 2005 || Kitt Peak || Spacewatch || — || align=right | 1.6 km || 
|-id=045 bgcolor=#fefefe
| 299045 ||  || — || January 16, 2005 || Kitt Peak || Spacewatch || NYS || align=right data-sort-value="0.87" | 870 m || 
|-id=046 bgcolor=#fefefe
| 299046 ||  || — || January 17, 2005 || Kitt Peak || Spacewatch || NYS || align=right data-sort-value="0.95" | 950 m || 
|-id=047 bgcolor=#fefefe
| 299047 ||  || — || January 16, 2005 || Kitt Peak || Spacewatch || — || align=right data-sort-value="0.92" | 920 m || 
|-id=048 bgcolor=#E9E9E9
| 299048 ||  || — || January 16, 2005 || Mauna Kea || C. Veillet || — || align=right | 1.1 km || 
|-id=049 bgcolor=#fefefe
| 299049 ||  || — || January 17, 2005 || Kitt Peak || Spacewatch || — || align=right data-sort-value="0.75" | 750 m || 
|-id=050 bgcolor=#E9E9E9
| 299050 ||  || — || January 18, 2005 || Catalina || CSS || EUN || align=right | 1.3 km || 
|-id=051 bgcolor=#fefefe
| 299051 ||  || — || February 1, 2005 || Catalina || CSS || NYS || align=right data-sort-value="0.81" | 810 m || 
|-id=052 bgcolor=#E9E9E9
| 299052 ||  || — || February 1, 2005 || Catalina || CSS || — || align=right | 1.3 km || 
|-id=053 bgcolor=#E9E9E9
| 299053 ||  || — || February 1, 2005 || Palomar || NEAT || — || align=right | 1.3 km || 
|-id=054 bgcolor=#fefefe
| 299054 ||  || — || February 1, 2005 || Catalina || CSS || MAS || align=right data-sort-value="0.80" | 800 m || 
|-id=055 bgcolor=#fefefe
| 299055 ||  || — || February 1, 2005 || Catalina || CSS || NYS || align=right | 1.1 km || 
|-id=056 bgcolor=#fefefe
| 299056 ||  || — || February 2, 2005 || Kitt Peak || Spacewatch || — || align=right | 1.1 km || 
|-id=057 bgcolor=#fefefe
| 299057 ||  || — || February 2, 2005 || Kitt Peak || Spacewatch || NYS || align=right data-sort-value="0.83" | 830 m || 
|-id=058 bgcolor=#fefefe
| 299058 ||  || — || February 2, 2005 || Socorro || LINEAR || — || align=right data-sort-value="0.91" | 910 m || 
|-id=059 bgcolor=#fefefe
| 299059 ||  || — || February 2, 2005 || Catalina || CSS || NYS || align=right | 1.0 km || 
|-id=060 bgcolor=#E9E9E9
| 299060 ||  || — || February 1, 2005 || Kitt Peak || Spacewatch || — || align=right | 1.3 km || 
|-id=061 bgcolor=#C2FFFF
| 299061 ||  || — || February 1, 2005 || Kitt Peak || Spacewatch || L5 || align=right | 9.2 km || 
|-id=062 bgcolor=#C2FFFF
| 299062 ||  || — || February 2, 2005 || Kitt Peak || Spacewatch || L5 || align=right | 11 km || 
|-id=063 bgcolor=#E9E9E9
| 299063 ||  || — || February 3, 2005 || Socorro || LINEAR || MAR || align=right | 1.5 km || 
|-id=064 bgcolor=#E9E9E9
| 299064 ||  || — || February 2, 2005 || Socorro || LINEAR || — || align=right | 1.3 km || 
|-id=065 bgcolor=#E9E9E9
| 299065 ||  || — || February 2, 2005 || Catalina || CSS || — || align=right | 1.6 km || 
|-id=066 bgcolor=#E9E9E9
| 299066 ||  || — || February 2, 2005 || Socorro || LINEAR || EUN || align=right | 1.8 km || 
|-id=067 bgcolor=#fefefe
| 299067 ||  || — || February 3, 2005 || Socorro || LINEAR || NYS || align=right data-sort-value="0.77" | 770 m || 
|-id=068 bgcolor=#E9E9E9
| 299068 ||  || — || January 13, 2005 || Socorro || LINEAR || EUN || align=right | 1.6 km || 
|-id=069 bgcolor=#E9E9E9
| 299069 ||  || — || February 9, 2005 || Socorro || LINEAR || XIZ || align=right | 1.6 km || 
|-id=070 bgcolor=#E9E9E9
| 299070 ||  || — || February 9, 2005 || Mount Lemmon || Mount Lemmon Survey || — || align=right data-sort-value="0.80" | 800 m || 
|-id=071 bgcolor=#E9E9E9
| 299071 ||  || — || February 9, 2005 || Anderson Mesa || LONEOS || — || align=right | 1.3 km || 
|-id=072 bgcolor=#d6d6d6
| 299072 ||  || — || February 17, 2005 || La Silla || A. Boattini, H. Scholl || — || align=right | 3.3 km || 
|-id=073 bgcolor=#fefefe
| 299073 ||  || — || March 3, 2005 || Socorro || LINEAR || H || align=right | 1.1 km || 
|-id=074 bgcolor=#fefefe
| 299074 ||  || — || March 2, 2005 || Kitt Peak || Spacewatch || — || align=right | 1.2 km || 
|-id=075 bgcolor=#E9E9E9
| 299075 ||  || — || March 2, 2005 || Kitt Peak || Spacewatch || — || align=right | 1.4 km || 
|-id=076 bgcolor=#fefefe
| 299076 ||  || — || March 2, 2005 || Catalina || CSS || — || align=right | 1.5 km || 
|-id=077 bgcolor=#E9E9E9
| 299077 ||  || — || March 2, 2005 || Catalina || CSS || — || align=right | 1.6 km || 
|-id=078 bgcolor=#E9E9E9
| 299078 ||  || — || March 3, 2005 || Kitt Peak || Spacewatch || 526 || align=right | 2.7 km || 
|-id=079 bgcolor=#E9E9E9
| 299079 ||  || — || March 3, 2005 || Catalina || CSS || — || align=right | 1.9 km || 
|-id=080 bgcolor=#E9E9E9
| 299080 ||  || — || March 3, 2005 || Catalina || CSS || — || align=right | 1.7 km || 
|-id=081 bgcolor=#E9E9E9
| 299081 ||  || — || March 8, 2005 || Junk Bond || Junk Bond Obs. || — || align=right | 1.9 km || 
|-id=082 bgcolor=#fefefe
| 299082 ||  || — || March 2, 2005 || Kitt Peak || Spacewatch || — || align=right | 1.0 km || 
|-id=083 bgcolor=#E9E9E9
| 299083 ||  || — || March 3, 2005 || Catalina || CSS || — || align=right | 1.9 km || 
|-id=084 bgcolor=#E9E9E9
| 299084 ||  || — || March 3, 2005 || Kitt Peak || Spacewatch || — || align=right | 2.0 km || 
|-id=085 bgcolor=#E9E9E9
| 299085 ||  || — || March 3, 2005 || Kitt Peak || Spacewatch || HNS || align=right | 1.5 km || 
|-id=086 bgcolor=#E9E9E9
| 299086 ||  || — || March 4, 2005 || Catalina || CSS || — || align=right | 1.8 km || 
|-id=087 bgcolor=#E9E9E9
| 299087 ||  || — || March 4, 2005 || Catalina || CSS || — || align=right | 1.1 km || 
|-id=088 bgcolor=#E9E9E9
| 299088 ||  || — || March 4, 2005 || Mount Lemmon || Mount Lemmon Survey || — || align=right | 3.8 km || 
|-id=089 bgcolor=#E9E9E9
| 299089 ||  || — || March 4, 2005 || Socorro || LINEAR || — || align=right | 1.4 km || 
|-id=090 bgcolor=#E9E9E9
| 299090 ||  || — || March 4, 2005 || Socorro || LINEAR || — || align=right | 3.7 km || 
|-id=091 bgcolor=#E9E9E9
| 299091 ||  || — || March 4, 2005 || Mount Lemmon || Mount Lemmon Survey || — || align=right | 2.7 km || 
|-id=092 bgcolor=#fefefe
| 299092 ||  || — || March 7, 2005 || Socorro || LINEAR || H || align=right data-sort-value="0.68" | 680 m || 
|-id=093 bgcolor=#E9E9E9
| 299093 ||  || — || March 3, 2005 || Kitt Peak || Spacewatch || — || align=right | 1.2 km || 
|-id=094 bgcolor=#E9E9E9
| 299094 ||  || — || March 3, 2005 || Catalina || CSS || EUN || align=right | 1.9 km || 
|-id=095 bgcolor=#E9E9E9
| 299095 ||  || — || March 4, 2005 || Kitt Peak || Spacewatch || — || align=right | 1.6 km || 
|-id=096 bgcolor=#E9E9E9
| 299096 ||  || — || March 4, 2005 || Kitt Peak || Spacewatch || — || align=right | 1.2 km || 
|-id=097 bgcolor=#E9E9E9
| 299097 ||  || — || March 8, 2005 || Kitt Peak || Spacewatch || WIT || align=right | 1.2 km || 
|-id=098 bgcolor=#E9E9E9
| 299098 ||  || — || March 8, 2005 || Anderson Mesa || LONEOS || — || align=right | 3.4 km || 
|-id=099 bgcolor=#E9E9E9
| 299099 ||  || — || March 8, 2005 || Socorro || LINEAR || — || align=right | 3.8 km || 
|-id=100 bgcolor=#E9E9E9
| 299100 ||  || — || March 3, 2005 || Catalina || CSS || — || align=right | 1.5 km || 
|}

299101–299200 

|-bgcolor=#E9E9E9
| 299101 ||  || — || March 4, 2005 || Catalina || CSS || — || align=right | 1.6 km || 
|-id=102 bgcolor=#E9E9E9
| 299102 ||  || — || March 4, 2005 || Catalina || CSS || — || align=right | 3.4 km || 
|-id=103 bgcolor=#E9E9E9
| 299103 ||  || — || March 4, 2005 || Socorro || LINEAR || — || align=right | 2.2 km || 
|-id=104 bgcolor=#E9E9E9
| 299104 ||  || — || March 4, 2005 || Mount Lemmon || Mount Lemmon Survey || — || align=right | 1.4 km || 
|-id=105 bgcolor=#E9E9E9
| 299105 ||  || — || March 7, 2005 || Socorro || LINEAR || — || align=right | 2.5 km || 
|-id=106 bgcolor=#E9E9E9
| 299106 ||  || — || March 9, 2005 || Kitt Peak || Spacewatch || — || align=right data-sort-value="0.99" | 990 m || 
|-id=107 bgcolor=#E9E9E9
| 299107 ||  || — || August 30, 1998 || Xinglong || SCAP || — || align=right | 2.1 km || 
|-id=108 bgcolor=#fefefe
| 299108 ||  || — || March 9, 2005 || Anderson Mesa || LONEOS || — || align=right data-sort-value="0.93" | 930 m || 
|-id=109 bgcolor=#E9E9E9
| 299109 ||  || — || March 9, 2005 || Mount Lemmon || Mount Lemmon Survey || — || align=right | 3.8 km || 
|-id=110 bgcolor=#E9E9E9
| 299110 ||  || — || March 9, 2005 || Socorro || LINEAR || MAR || align=right | 2.0 km || 
|-id=111 bgcolor=#E9E9E9
| 299111 ||  || — || March 9, 2005 || Mount Lemmon || Mount Lemmon Survey || GEF || align=right | 1.4 km || 
|-id=112 bgcolor=#E9E9E9
| 299112 ||  || — || March 10, 2005 || Catalina || CSS || MIT || align=right | 2.8 km || 
|-id=113 bgcolor=#E9E9E9
| 299113 ||  || — || March 10, 2005 || Kitt Peak || Spacewatch || — || align=right | 2.5 km || 
|-id=114 bgcolor=#E9E9E9
| 299114 ||  || — || March 10, 2005 || Kitt Peak || Spacewatch || EUN || align=right | 1.7 km || 
|-id=115 bgcolor=#E9E9E9
| 299115 ||  || — || March 9, 2005 || Catalina || CSS || ADE || align=right | 2.3 km || 
|-id=116 bgcolor=#E9E9E9
| 299116 ||  || — || March 9, 2005 || Mount Lemmon || Mount Lemmon Survey || — || align=right | 1.9 km || 
|-id=117 bgcolor=#E9E9E9
| 299117 ||  || — || March 9, 2005 || Mount Lemmon || Mount Lemmon Survey || — || align=right | 2.7 km || 
|-id=118 bgcolor=#E9E9E9
| 299118 ||  || — || March 9, 2005 || Siding Spring || SSS || — || align=right | 2.9 km || 
|-id=119 bgcolor=#fefefe
| 299119 ||  || — || March 9, 2005 || Anderson Mesa || LONEOS || H || align=right data-sort-value="0.80" | 800 m || 
|-id=120 bgcolor=#E9E9E9
| 299120 ||  || — || March 9, 2005 || Kitt Peak || Spacewatch || — || align=right | 1.8 km || 
|-id=121 bgcolor=#fefefe
| 299121 ||  || — || March 10, 2005 || Mount Lemmon || Mount Lemmon Survey || H || align=right data-sort-value="0.67" | 670 m || 
|-id=122 bgcolor=#E9E9E9
| 299122 ||  || — || March 11, 2005 || Mount Lemmon || Mount Lemmon Survey || — || align=right | 1.6 km || 
|-id=123 bgcolor=#E9E9E9
| 299123 ||  || — || March 11, 2005 || Mount Lemmon || Mount Lemmon Survey || — || align=right | 2.1 km || 
|-id=124 bgcolor=#E9E9E9
| 299124 ||  || — || March 11, 2005 || Mount Lemmon || Mount Lemmon Survey || AEO || align=right | 1.2 km || 
|-id=125 bgcolor=#E9E9E9
| 299125 ||  || — || March 12, 2005 || Kitt Peak || Spacewatch || — || align=right | 1.9 km || 
|-id=126 bgcolor=#E9E9E9
| 299126 ||  || — || March 13, 2005 || Mount Lemmon || Mount Lemmon Survey || — || align=right | 1.6 km || 
|-id=127 bgcolor=#E9E9E9
| 299127 ||  || — || March 4, 2005 || Mount Lemmon || Mount Lemmon Survey || PAD || align=right | 1.8 km || 
|-id=128 bgcolor=#E9E9E9
| 299128 ||  || — || March 8, 2005 || Socorro || LINEAR || — || align=right | 3.5 km || 
|-id=129 bgcolor=#E9E9E9
| 299129 ||  || — || March 9, 2005 || Catalina || CSS || — || align=right | 1.8 km || 
|-id=130 bgcolor=#E9E9E9
| 299130 ||  || — || March 9, 2005 || Catalina || CSS || MAR || align=right | 1.8 km || 
|-id=131 bgcolor=#E9E9E9
| 299131 ||  || — || March 9, 2005 || Socorro || LINEAR || — || align=right | 1.1 km || 
|-id=132 bgcolor=#fefefe
| 299132 ||  || — || March 11, 2005 || Mount Lemmon || Mount Lemmon Survey || H || align=right data-sort-value="0.98" | 980 m || 
|-id=133 bgcolor=#E9E9E9
| 299133 ||  || — || March 12, 2005 || Socorro || LINEAR || MAR || align=right | 1.7 km || 
|-id=134 bgcolor=#E9E9E9
| 299134 Moggicecchi ||  ||  || March 10, 2005 || San Marcello || L. Tesi, G. Fagioli || — || align=right | 1.1 km || 
|-id=135 bgcolor=#E9E9E9
| 299135 ||  || — || March 11, 2005 || Kitt Peak || Spacewatch || — || align=right | 1.8 km || 
|-id=136 bgcolor=#E9E9E9
| 299136 ||  || — || March 11, 2005 || Kitt Peak || Spacewatch || — || align=right | 3.2 km || 
|-id=137 bgcolor=#E9E9E9
| 299137 ||  || — || March 11, 2005 || Kitt Peak || Spacewatch || — || align=right | 1.2 km || 
|-id=138 bgcolor=#E9E9E9
| 299138 ||  || — || March 11, 2005 || Kitt Peak || Spacewatch || — || align=right data-sort-value="0.98" | 980 m || 
|-id=139 bgcolor=#E9E9E9
| 299139 ||  || — || March 11, 2005 || Catalina || CSS || — || align=right | 2.5 km || 
|-id=140 bgcolor=#fefefe
| 299140 ||  || — || March 11, 2005 || Catalina || CSS || H || align=right data-sort-value="0.81" | 810 m || 
|-id=141 bgcolor=#E9E9E9
| 299141 ||  || — || March 12, 2005 || Kitt Peak || Spacewatch || WIT || align=right data-sort-value="0.99" | 990 m || 
|-id=142 bgcolor=#E9E9E9
| 299142 ||  || — || March 12, 2005 || Kitt Peak || Spacewatch || — || align=right | 1.8 km || 
|-id=143 bgcolor=#E9E9E9
| 299143 ||  || — || March 11, 2005 || Kitt Peak || Spacewatch || — || align=right | 2.2 km || 
|-id=144 bgcolor=#E9E9E9
| 299144 ||  || — || March 13, 2005 || Kitt Peak || Spacewatch || GEF || align=right | 1.3 km || 
|-id=145 bgcolor=#E9E9E9
| 299145 ||  || — || March 13, 2005 || Kitt Peak || Spacewatch || — || align=right | 1.2 km || 
|-id=146 bgcolor=#E9E9E9
| 299146 ||  || — || March 13, 2005 || Kitt Peak || Spacewatch || HNS || align=right | 1.8 km || 
|-id=147 bgcolor=#fefefe
| 299147 ||  || — || March 12, 2005 || Socorro || LINEAR || H || align=right | 1.0 km || 
|-id=148 bgcolor=#E9E9E9
| 299148 ||  || — || March 3, 2005 || Kitt Peak || Spacewatch || — || align=right | 2.7 km || 
|-id=149 bgcolor=#E9E9E9
| 299149 ||  || — || March 8, 2005 || Catalina || CSS || JUN || align=right | 1.4 km || 
|-id=150 bgcolor=#E9E9E9
| 299150 ||  || — || March 10, 2005 || Catalina || CSS || JUN || align=right | 1.5 km || 
|-id=151 bgcolor=#E9E9E9
| 299151 ||  || — || March 11, 2005 || Anderson Mesa || LONEOS || — || align=right | 3.5 km || 
|-id=152 bgcolor=#E9E9E9
| 299152 ||  || — || March 9, 2005 || Mount Lemmon || Mount Lemmon Survey || — || align=right | 2.9 km || 
|-id=153 bgcolor=#E9E9E9
| 299153 ||  || — || March 11, 2005 || Kitt Peak || M. W. Buie || — || align=right | 1.1 km || 
|-id=154 bgcolor=#E9E9E9
| 299154 ||  || — || March 13, 2005 || Mount Lemmon || Mount Lemmon Survey || ADE || align=right | 2.5 km || 
|-id=155 bgcolor=#E9E9E9
| 299155 ||  || — || March 3, 2005 || Catalina || CSS || — || align=right | 2.0 km || 
|-id=156 bgcolor=#E9E9E9
| 299156 ||  || — || March 18, 2005 || Catalina || CSS || — || align=right | 2.6 km || 
|-id=157 bgcolor=#E9E9E9
| 299157 ||  || — || March 30, 2005 || Catalina || CSS || PAE || align=right | 3.2 km || 
|-id=158 bgcolor=#E9E9E9
| 299158 ||  || — || April 1, 2005 || Kitt Peak || Spacewatch || MAR || align=right | 1.2 km || 
|-id=159 bgcolor=#E9E9E9
| 299159 ||  || — || April 1, 2005 || Kitt Peak || Spacewatch || — || align=right | 2.4 km || 
|-id=160 bgcolor=#E9E9E9
| 299160 ||  || — || April 1, 2005 || Kitt Peak || Spacewatch || — || align=right | 2.6 km || 
|-id=161 bgcolor=#E9E9E9
| 299161 ||  || — || April 1, 2005 || Anderson Mesa || LONEOS || — || align=right | 2.9 km || 
|-id=162 bgcolor=#E9E9E9
| 299162 ||  || — || April 1, 2005 || Anderson Mesa || LONEOS || — || align=right | 4.0 km || 
|-id=163 bgcolor=#E9E9E9
| 299163 ||  || — || April 2, 2005 || Mount Lemmon || Mount Lemmon Survey || — || align=right | 1.1 km || 
|-id=164 bgcolor=#E9E9E9
| 299164 ||  || — || April 2, 2005 || Palomar || NEAT || MIS || align=right | 3.1 km || 
|-id=165 bgcolor=#E9E9E9
| 299165 ||  || — || April 2, 2005 || Mount Lemmon || Mount Lemmon Survey || — || align=right | 2.9 km || 
|-id=166 bgcolor=#E9E9E9
| 299166 ||  || — || April 3, 2005 || Palomar || NEAT || — || align=right | 2.4 km || 
|-id=167 bgcolor=#E9E9E9
| 299167 ||  || — || April 2, 2005 || Mount Lemmon || Mount Lemmon Survey || — || align=right | 2.5 km || 
|-id=168 bgcolor=#E9E9E9
| 299168 ||  || — || April 2, 2005 || Mount Lemmon || Mount Lemmon Survey || EUN || align=right | 1.4 km || 
|-id=169 bgcolor=#E9E9E9
| 299169 ||  || — || April 2, 2005 || Siding Spring || SSS || — || align=right | 1.9 km || 
|-id=170 bgcolor=#E9E9E9
| 299170 ||  || — || April 4, 2005 || Mount Lemmon || Mount Lemmon Survey || AGN || align=right | 1.5 km || 
|-id=171 bgcolor=#E9E9E9
| 299171 ||  || — || April 5, 2005 || Mount Lemmon || Mount Lemmon Survey || — || align=right | 1.4 km || 
|-id=172 bgcolor=#E9E9E9
| 299172 ||  || — || April 5, 2005 || Mount Lemmon || Mount Lemmon Survey || — || align=right | 1.3 km || 
|-id=173 bgcolor=#E9E9E9
| 299173 ||  || — || April 6, 2005 || Mount Lemmon || Mount Lemmon Survey || — || align=right | 2.4 km || 
|-id=174 bgcolor=#E9E9E9
| 299174 ||  || — || April 6, 2005 || Mount Lemmon || Mount Lemmon Survey || — || align=right | 3.3 km || 
|-id=175 bgcolor=#E9E9E9
| 299175 ||  || — || April 6, 2005 || Jarnac || Jarnac Obs. || — || align=right | 3.5 km || 
|-id=176 bgcolor=#E9E9E9
| 299176 ||  || — || April 4, 2005 || Catalina || CSS || GEF || align=right | 1.8 km || 
|-id=177 bgcolor=#E9E9E9
| 299177 ||  || — || April 5, 2005 || Catalina || CSS || — || align=right | 3.6 km || 
|-id=178 bgcolor=#fefefe
| 299178 ||  || — || April 5, 2005 || Catalina || CSS || H || align=right data-sort-value="0.79" | 790 m || 
|-id=179 bgcolor=#E9E9E9
| 299179 ||  || — || April 6, 2005 || Kitt Peak || Spacewatch || — || align=right | 2.4 km || 
|-id=180 bgcolor=#E9E9E9
| 299180 ||  || — || April 7, 2005 || Kitt Peak || Spacewatch || — || align=right | 1.0 km || 
|-id=181 bgcolor=#E9E9E9
| 299181 ||  || — || April 6, 2005 || Mount Lemmon || Mount Lemmon Survey || — || align=right | 2.2 km || 
|-id=182 bgcolor=#E9E9E9
| 299182 ||  || — || April 7, 2005 || Kitt Peak || Spacewatch || — || align=right | 2.6 km || 
|-id=183 bgcolor=#E9E9E9
| 299183 ||  || — || April 10, 2005 || Kitt Peak || Spacewatch || — || align=right | 1.4 km || 
|-id=184 bgcolor=#E9E9E9
| 299184 ||  || — || April 10, 2005 || Kitt Peak || Spacewatch || WIT || align=right | 1.2 km || 
|-id=185 bgcolor=#E9E9E9
| 299185 ||  || — || April 10, 2005 || Mount Lemmon || Mount Lemmon Survey || — || align=right | 3.3 km || 
|-id=186 bgcolor=#E9E9E9
| 299186 ||  || — || April 10, 2005 || Mount Lemmon || Mount Lemmon Survey || — || align=right | 1.2 km || 
|-id=187 bgcolor=#E9E9E9
| 299187 ||  || — || April 11, 2005 || Mount Lemmon || Mount Lemmon Survey || HNS || align=right | 1.9 km || 
|-id=188 bgcolor=#E9E9E9
| 299188 ||  || — || April 12, 2005 || Mount Lemmon || Mount Lemmon Survey || — || align=right | 1.2 km || 
|-id=189 bgcolor=#fefefe
| 299189 ||  || — || April 12, 2005 || Socorro || LINEAR || H || align=right data-sort-value="0.70" | 700 m || 
|-id=190 bgcolor=#E9E9E9
| 299190 ||  || — || April 10, 2005 || Kitt Peak || Spacewatch || PAE || align=right | 3.8 km || 
|-id=191 bgcolor=#E9E9E9
| 299191 ||  || — || April 10, 2005 || Kitt Peak || Spacewatch || — || align=right | 3.3 km || 
|-id=192 bgcolor=#E9E9E9
| 299192 ||  || — || April 9, 2005 || Mount Lemmon || Mount Lemmon Survey || — || align=right | 1.4 km || 
|-id=193 bgcolor=#E9E9E9
| 299193 ||  || — || April 11, 2005 || Kitt Peak || Spacewatch || GEF || align=right | 1.5 km || 
|-id=194 bgcolor=#E9E9E9
| 299194 ||  || — || April 11, 2005 || Kitt Peak || Spacewatch || — || align=right | 2.4 km || 
|-id=195 bgcolor=#E9E9E9
| 299195 ||  || — || April 11, 2005 || Mount Lemmon || Mount Lemmon Survey || ADE || align=right | 3.3 km || 
|-id=196 bgcolor=#E9E9E9
| 299196 ||  || — || April 10, 2005 || Mount Lemmon || Mount Lemmon Survey || — || align=right | 2.2 km || 
|-id=197 bgcolor=#E9E9E9
| 299197 ||  || — || April 11, 2005 || Kitt Peak || Spacewatch || — || align=right | 2.6 km || 
|-id=198 bgcolor=#FA8072
| 299198 ||  || — || April 14, 2005 || Kitt Peak || Spacewatch || — || align=right | 1.5 km || 
|-id=199 bgcolor=#E9E9E9
| 299199 ||  || — || April 12, 2005 || Kitt Peak || M. W. Buie || — || align=right | 2.9 km || 
|-id=200 bgcolor=#E9E9E9
| 299200 ||  || — || April 2, 2005 || Mount Lemmon || Mount Lemmon Survey || — || align=right | 2.8 km || 
|}

299201–299300 

|-bgcolor=#E9E9E9
| 299201 ||  || — || April 10, 2005 || Kitt Peak || Spacewatch || PAD || align=right | 1.9 km || 
|-id=202 bgcolor=#E9E9E9
| 299202 ||  || — || April 16, 2005 || Catalina || CSS || INO || align=right | 1.3 km || 
|-id=203 bgcolor=#E9E9E9
| 299203 ||  || — || April 18, 2005 || Cordell-Lorenz || D. T. Durig || GER || align=right | 2.1 km || 
|-id=204 bgcolor=#E9E9E9
| 299204 ||  || — || April 30, 2005 || Kitt Peak || Spacewatch || — || align=right | 3.2 km || 
|-id=205 bgcolor=#E9E9E9
| 299205 ||  || — || April 17, 2005 || Kitt Peak || Spacewatch || — || align=right | 2.0 km || 
|-id=206 bgcolor=#E9E9E9
| 299206 ||  || — || May 4, 2005 || Mauna Kea || C. Veillet || — || align=right | 1.0 km || 
|-id=207 bgcolor=#fefefe
| 299207 ||  || — || May 3, 2005 || Kitt Peak || Spacewatch || H || align=right data-sort-value="0.94" | 940 m || 
|-id=208 bgcolor=#E9E9E9
| 299208 ||  || — || May 4, 2005 || Kitt Peak || Spacewatch || — || align=right | 3.2 km || 
|-id=209 bgcolor=#d6d6d6
| 299209 ||  || — || May 4, 2005 || Catalina || CSS || 627 || align=right | 3.0 km || 
|-id=210 bgcolor=#E9E9E9
| 299210 ||  || — || May 6, 2005 || Mount Lemmon || Mount Lemmon Survey || HNS || align=right | 1.2 km || 
|-id=211 bgcolor=#E9E9E9
| 299211 ||  || — || May 8, 2005 || Mount Lemmon || Mount Lemmon Survey || AGN || align=right | 1.6 km || 
|-id=212 bgcolor=#E9E9E9
| 299212 ||  || — || May 3, 2005 || Kitt Peak || Spacewatch || — || align=right | 2.4 km || 
|-id=213 bgcolor=#E9E9E9
| 299213 ||  || — || May 4, 2005 || Kitt Peak || Spacewatch || — || align=right | 2.4 km || 
|-id=214 bgcolor=#E9E9E9
| 299214 ||  || — || May 4, 2005 || Kitt Peak || Spacewatch || HOF || align=right | 3.0 km || 
|-id=215 bgcolor=#E9E9E9
| 299215 ||  || — || May 4, 2005 || Mount Lemmon || Mount Lemmon Survey || HOF || align=right | 2.9 km || 
|-id=216 bgcolor=#d6d6d6
| 299216 ||  || — || May 9, 2005 || Mount Lemmon || Mount Lemmon Survey || KOR || align=right | 1.4 km || 
|-id=217 bgcolor=#E9E9E9
| 299217 ||  || — || May 8, 2005 || Anderson Mesa || LONEOS || — || align=right | 3.8 km || 
|-id=218 bgcolor=#E9E9E9
| 299218 ||  || — || May 8, 2005 || Mount Lemmon || Mount Lemmon Survey || AST || align=right | 2.0 km || 
|-id=219 bgcolor=#E9E9E9
| 299219 ||  || — || May 9, 2005 || Socorro || LINEAR || — || align=right | 3.0 km || 
|-id=220 bgcolor=#d6d6d6
| 299220 ||  || — || May 10, 2005 || Kitt Peak || Spacewatch || CHA || align=right | 3.2 km || 
|-id=221 bgcolor=#E9E9E9
| 299221 ||  || — || May 10, 2005 || Mount Lemmon || Mount Lemmon Survey || HEN || align=right | 1.4 km || 
|-id=222 bgcolor=#E9E9E9
| 299222 ||  || — || May 9, 2005 || Mount Lemmon || Mount Lemmon Survey || — || align=right | 1.5 km || 
|-id=223 bgcolor=#E9E9E9
| 299223 ||  || — || May 11, 2005 || Palomar || NEAT || — || align=right | 2.9 km || 
|-id=224 bgcolor=#E9E9E9
| 299224 ||  || — || May 11, 2005 || Palomar || NEAT || — || align=right | 1.9 km || 
|-id=225 bgcolor=#d6d6d6
| 299225 ||  || — || May 8, 2005 || Kitt Peak || Spacewatch || — || align=right | 3.0 km || 
|-id=226 bgcolor=#E9E9E9
| 299226 ||  || — || May 8, 2005 || Mount Lemmon || Mount Lemmon Survey || — || align=right | 2.6 km || 
|-id=227 bgcolor=#E9E9E9
| 299227 ||  || — || May 10, 2005 || Kitt Peak || Spacewatch || RAF || align=right | 1.1 km || 
|-id=228 bgcolor=#E9E9E9
| 299228 ||  || — || May 10, 2005 || Kitt Peak || Spacewatch || HOF || align=right | 3.1 km || 
|-id=229 bgcolor=#E9E9E9
| 299229 ||  || — || May 11, 2005 || Kitt Peak || Spacewatch || — || align=right | 2.3 km || 
|-id=230 bgcolor=#E9E9E9
| 299230 ||  || — || May 13, 2005 || Mount Lemmon || Mount Lemmon Survey || AGN || align=right | 1.5 km || 
|-id=231 bgcolor=#E9E9E9
| 299231 ||  || — || May 13, 2005 || Mount Lemmon || Mount Lemmon Survey || — || align=right | 2.7 km || 
|-id=232 bgcolor=#E9E9E9
| 299232 ||  || — || May 13, 2005 || Siding Spring || SSS || — || align=right | 3.5 km || 
|-id=233 bgcolor=#E9E9E9
| 299233 ||  || — || May 3, 2005 || Kitt Peak || Spacewatch || — || align=right | 2.2 km || 
|-id=234 bgcolor=#d6d6d6
| 299234 ||  || — || May 16, 2005 || Mount Lemmon || Mount Lemmon Survey || — || align=right | 2.5 km || 
|-id=235 bgcolor=#d6d6d6
| 299235 ||  || — || June 4, 2005 || Kitt Peak || Spacewatch || — || align=right | 3.6 km || 
|-id=236 bgcolor=#E9E9E9
| 299236 ||  || — || May 11, 2005 || Palomar || NEAT || — || align=right | 3.4 km || 
|-id=237 bgcolor=#E9E9E9
| 299237 ||  || — || June 11, 2005 || Kitt Peak || Spacewatch || — || align=right | 2.3 km || 
|-id=238 bgcolor=#d6d6d6
| 299238 ||  || — || June 14, 2005 || Anderson Mesa || LONEOS || EUP || align=right | 7.4 km || 
|-id=239 bgcolor=#d6d6d6
| 299239 ||  || — || June 27, 2005 || Kitt Peak || Spacewatch || TIR || align=right | 4.1 km || 
|-id=240 bgcolor=#d6d6d6
| 299240 ||  || — || June 30, 2005 || Junk Bond || D. Healy || — || align=right | 4.1 km || 
|-id=241 bgcolor=#d6d6d6
| 299241 ||  || — || June 29, 2005 || Kitt Peak || Spacewatch || — || align=right | 4.0 km || 
|-id=242 bgcolor=#d6d6d6
| 299242 ||  || — || June 30, 2005 || Kitt Peak || Spacewatch || — || align=right | 3.7 km || 
|-id=243 bgcolor=#d6d6d6
| 299243 ||  || — || June 30, 2005 || Kitt Peak || Spacewatch || — || align=right | 3.3 km || 
|-id=244 bgcolor=#d6d6d6
| 299244 ||  || — || June 29, 2005 || Kitt Peak || Spacewatch || EOS || align=right | 2.6 km || 
|-id=245 bgcolor=#d6d6d6
| 299245 ||  || — || June 29, 2005 || Kitt Peak || Spacewatch || EOS || align=right | 2.3 km || 
|-id=246 bgcolor=#d6d6d6
| 299246 ||  || — || June 30, 2005 || Kitt Peak || Spacewatch || — || align=right | 3.4 km || 
|-id=247 bgcolor=#d6d6d6
| 299247 ||  || — || June 30, 2005 || Kitt Peak || Spacewatch || — || align=right | 3.6 km || 
|-id=248 bgcolor=#d6d6d6
| 299248 ||  || — || June 29, 2005 || Palomar || NEAT || TIR || align=right | 3.9 km || 
|-id=249 bgcolor=#d6d6d6
| 299249 ||  || — || June 29, 2005 || Kitt Peak || Spacewatch || — || align=right | 4.5 km || 
|-id=250 bgcolor=#d6d6d6
| 299250 ||  || — || June 28, 2005 || Palomar || NEAT || — || align=right | 4.4 km || 
|-id=251 bgcolor=#d6d6d6
| 299251 ||  || — || June 30, 2005 || Palomar || NEAT || — || align=right | 3.7 km || 
|-id=252 bgcolor=#d6d6d6
| 299252 ||  || — || June 17, 2005 || Siding Spring || SSS || Tj (2.97) || align=right | 5.6 km || 
|-id=253 bgcolor=#d6d6d6
| 299253 ||  || — || July 3, 2005 || Mount Lemmon || Mount Lemmon Survey || — || align=right | 2.8 km || 
|-id=254 bgcolor=#d6d6d6
| 299254 ||  || — || July 1, 2005 || Kitt Peak || Spacewatch || — || align=right | 4.3 km || 
|-id=255 bgcolor=#d6d6d6
| 299255 ||  || — || July 1, 2005 || Kitt Peak || Spacewatch || VER || align=right | 2.9 km || 
|-id=256 bgcolor=#d6d6d6
| 299256 ||  || — || July 4, 2005 || Palomar || NEAT || — || align=right | 5.7 km || 
|-id=257 bgcolor=#d6d6d6
| 299257 ||  || — || July 4, 2005 || Kitt Peak || Spacewatch || — || align=right | 3.9 km || 
|-id=258 bgcolor=#d6d6d6
| 299258 ||  || — || July 5, 2005 || Palomar || NEAT || — || align=right | 3.2 km || 
|-id=259 bgcolor=#d6d6d6
| 299259 ||  || — || July 5, 2005 || Palomar || NEAT || — || align=right | 2.7 km || 
|-id=260 bgcolor=#d6d6d6
| 299260 ||  || — || July 5, 2005 || Palomar || NEAT || — || align=right | 4.0 km || 
|-id=261 bgcolor=#d6d6d6
| 299261 ||  || — || July 7, 2005 || Kitt Peak || Spacewatch || — || align=right | 4.2 km || 
|-id=262 bgcolor=#d6d6d6
| 299262 ||  || — || July 8, 2005 || Kitt Peak || Spacewatch || — || align=right | 3.6 km || 
|-id=263 bgcolor=#d6d6d6
| 299263 ||  || — || July 6, 2005 || Kitt Peak || Spacewatch || EOS || align=right | 2.8 km || 
|-id=264 bgcolor=#d6d6d6
| 299264 ||  || — || July 9, 2005 || Kitt Peak || Spacewatch || — || align=right | 2.8 km || 
|-id=265 bgcolor=#d6d6d6
| 299265 ||  || — || July 9, 2005 || Kitt Peak || Spacewatch || — || align=right | 3.5 km || 
|-id=266 bgcolor=#d6d6d6
| 299266 ||  || — || July 11, 2005 || Kitt Peak || Spacewatch || — || align=right | 4.9 km || 
|-id=267 bgcolor=#d6d6d6
| 299267 ||  || — || July 1, 2005 || Kitt Peak || Spacewatch || HYG || align=right | 3.2 km || 
|-id=268 bgcolor=#d6d6d6
| 299268 ||  || — || July 10, 2005 || Kitt Peak || Spacewatch || THM || align=right | 2.1 km || 
|-id=269 bgcolor=#d6d6d6
| 299269 ||  || — || July 12, 2005 || Mount Lemmon || Mount Lemmon Survey || — || align=right | 2.7 km || 
|-id=270 bgcolor=#d6d6d6
| 299270 ||  || — || July 10, 2005 || Reedy Creek || J. Broughton || — || align=right | 3.7 km || 
|-id=271 bgcolor=#d6d6d6
| 299271 ||  || — || July 3, 2005 || Mount Lemmon || Mount Lemmon Survey || EOS || align=right | 3.0 km || 
|-id=272 bgcolor=#d6d6d6
| 299272 ||  || — || July 10, 2005 || Kitt Peak || Spacewatch || — || align=right | 2.5 km || 
|-id=273 bgcolor=#d6d6d6
| 299273 ||  || — || July 5, 2005 || Kitt Peak || Spacewatch || — || align=right | 4.2 km || 
|-id=274 bgcolor=#d6d6d6
| 299274 ||  || — || July 3, 2005 || Mount Lemmon || Mount Lemmon Survey || — || align=right | 2.8 km || 
|-id=275 bgcolor=#d6d6d6
| 299275 ||  || — || July 3, 2005 || Siding Spring || SSS || EUP || align=right | 4.3 km || 
|-id=276 bgcolor=#d6d6d6
| 299276 ||  || — || July 8, 2005 || Anderson Mesa || LONEOS || THB || align=right | 5.0 km || 
|-id=277 bgcolor=#d6d6d6
| 299277 ||  || — || July 9, 2005 || Kitt Peak || Spacewatch || EOS || align=right | 2.8 km || 
|-id=278 bgcolor=#d6d6d6
| 299278 ||  || — || July 16, 2005 || Reedy Creek || J. Broughton || — || align=right | 4.8 km || 
|-id=279 bgcolor=#d6d6d6
| 299279 ||  || — || July 30, 2005 || Socorro || LINEAR || EUP || align=right | 6.1 km || 
|-id=280 bgcolor=#d6d6d6
| 299280 ||  || — || July 28, 2005 || Palomar || NEAT || — || align=right | 3.4 km || 
|-id=281 bgcolor=#d6d6d6
| 299281 ||  || — || July 29, 2005 || Palomar || NEAT || — || align=right | 3.2 km || 
|-id=282 bgcolor=#d6d6d6
| 299282 ||  || — || July 30, 2005 || Palomar || NEAT || — || align=right | 4.6 km || 
|-id=283 bgcolor=#d6d6d6
| 299283 ||  || — || July 30, 2005 || Palomar || NEAT || — || align=right | 4.3 km || 
|-id=284 bgcolor=#d6d6d6
| 299284 ||  || — || July 30, 2005 || Palomar || NEAT || — || align=right | 6.2 km || 
|-id=285 bgcolor=#d6d6d6
| 299285 ||  || — || July 27, 2005 || Siding Spring || SSS || TIR || align=right | 4.2 km || 
|-id=286 bgcolor=#d6d6d6
| 299286 ||  || — || August 4, 2005 || Palomar || NEAT || THM || align=right | 2.7 km || 
|-id=287 bgcolor=#d6d6d6
| 299287 ||  || — || August 4, 2005 || Palomar || NEAT || — || align=right | 3.8 km || 
|-id=288 bgcolor=#d6d6d6
| 299288 ||  || — || August 4, 2005 || Palomar || NEAT || — || align=right | 2.7 km || 
|-id=289 bgcolor=#d6d6d6
| 299289 ||  || — || August 4, 2005 || Palomar || NEAT || — || align=right | 4.1 km || 
|-id=290 bgcolor=#d6d6d6
| 299290 ||  || — || August 4, 2005 || Palomar || NEAT || — || align=right | 3.8 km || 
|-id=291 bgcolor=#d6d6d6
| 299291 ||  || — || August 13, 2005 || Wrightwood || J. W. Young || — || align=right | 5.6 km || 
|-id=292 bgcolor=#d6d6d6
| 299292 ||  || — || August 1, 2005 || Siding Spring || SSS || VER || align=right | 5.9 km || 
|-id=293 bgcolor=#d6d6d6
| 299293 || 2005 QJ || — || August 23, 2005 || Pla D'Arguines || R. Ferrando || EOS || align=right | 2.9 km || 
|-id=294 bgcolor=#d6d6d6
| 299294 ||  || — || August 22, 2005 || Palomar || NEAT || LIX || align=right | 3.5 km || 
|-id=295 bgcolor=#d6d6d6
| 299295 ||  || — || August 22, 2005 || Palomar || NEAT || — || align=right | 4.4 km || 
|-id=296 bgcolor=#d6d6d6
| 299296 ||  || — || August 24, 2005 || Palomar || NEAT || — || align=right | 5.6 km || 
|-id=297 bgcolor=#d6d6d6
| 299297 ||  || — || August 24, 2005 || Palomar || NEAT || HYG || align=right | 3.8 km || 
|-id=298 bgcolor=#d6d6d6
| 299298 ||  || — || August 26, 2005 || Palomar || NEAT || VER || align=right | 3.8 km || 
|-id=299 bgcolor=#d6d6d6
| 299299 ||  || — || August 22, 2005 || Haleakala || NEAT || — || align=right | 4.7 km || 
|-id=300 bgcolor=#d6d6d6
| 299300 ||  || — || August 25, 2005 || Palomar || NEAT || — || align=right | 5.1 km || 
|}

299301–299400 

|-bgcolor=#d6d6d6
| 299301 ||  || — || August 25, 2005 || Palomar || NEAT || EUP || align=right | 9.2 km || 
|-id=302 bgcolor=#d6d6d6
| 299302 ||  || — || August 26, 2005 || Anderson Mesa || LONEOS || — || align=right | 4.5 km || 
|-id=303 bgcolor=#d6d6d6
| 299303 ||  || — || August 26, 2005 || Palomar || NEAT || — || align=right | 3.6 km || 
|-id=304 bgcolor=#d6d6d6
| 299304 ||  || — || August 26, 2005 || Palomar || NEAT || — || align=right | 4.5 km || 
|-id=305 bgcolor=#d6d6d6
| 299305 ||  || — || August 26, 2005 || Palomar || NEAT || — || align=right | 3.4 km || 
|-id=306 bgcolor=#d6d6d6
| 299306 ||  || — || August 26, 2005 || Palomar || NEAT || ALA || align=right | 5.7 km || 
|-id=307 bgcolor=#d6d6d6
| 299307 ||  || — || August 26, 2005 || Palomar || NEAT || VER || align=right | 3.0 km || 
|-id=308 bgcolor=#d6d6d6
| 299308 ||  || — || August 26, 2005 || Palomar || NEAT || — || align=right | 4.5 km || 
|-id=309 bgcolor=#d6d6d6
| 299309 ||  || — || August 28, 2005 || Kitt Peak || Spacewatch || — || align=right | 4.0 km || 
|-id=310 bgcolor=#d6d6d6
| 299310 ||  || — || August 26, 2005 || Palomar || NEAT || — || align=right | 3.5 km || 
|-id=311 bgcolor=#d6d6d6
| 299311 ||  || — || August 29, 2005 || Anderson Mesa || LONEOS || THM || align=right | 2.7 km || 
|-id=312 bgcolor=#d6d6d6
| 299312 ||  || — || August 30, 2005 || Saint-Véran || Saint-Véran Obs. || — || align=right | 5.1 km || 
|-id=313 bgcolor=#d6d6d6
| 299313 ||  || — || August 30, 2005 || Kitt Peak || Spacewatch || EOS || align=right | 2.3 km || 
|-id=314 bgcolor=#d6d6d6
| 299314 ||  || — || August 25, 2005 || Palomar || NEAT || — || align=right | 4.7 km || 
|-id=315 bgcolor=#d6d6d6
| 299315 ||  || — || August 27, 2005 || Palomar || NEAT || — || align=right | 4.1 km || 
|-id=316 bgcolor=#d6d6d6
| 299316 ||  || — || August 27, 2005 || Palomar || NEAT || — || align=right | 3.7 km || 
|-id=317 bgcolor=#d6d6d6
| 299317 ||  || — || August 27, 2005 || Palomar || NEAT || — || align=right | 3.3 km || 
|-id=318 bgcolor=#d6d6d6
| 299318 ||  || — || August 27, 2005 || Palomar || NEAT || — || align=right | 3.2 km || 
|-id=319 bgcolor=#d6d6d6
| 299319 ||  || — || August 27, 2005 || Palomar || NEAT || EOS || align=right | 2.3 km || 
|-id=320 bgcolor=#d6d6d6
| 299320 ||  || — || August 27, 2005 || Palomar || NEAT || VER || align=right | 3.0 km || 
|-id=321 bgcolor=#d6d6d6
| 299321 ||  || — || August 27, 2005 || Palomar || NEAT || — || align=right | 3.1 km || 
|-id=322 bgcolor=#d6d6d6
| 299322 ||  || — || August 27, 2005 || Palomar || NEAT || — || align=right | 4.5 km || 
|-id=323 bgcolor=#d6d6d6
| 299323 ||  || — || August 28, 2005 || Kitt Peak || Spacewatch || — || align=right | 2.7 km || 
|-id=324 bgcolor=#d6d6d6
| 299324 ||  || — || August 28, 2005 || Kitt Peak || Spacewatch || — || align=right | 4.7 km || 
|-id=325 bgcolor=#d6d6d6
| 299325 ||  || — || August 30, 2005 || Kitt Peak || Spacewatch || HYG || align=right | 3.6 km || 
|-id=326 bgcolor=#d6d6d6
| 299326 ||  || — || August 27, 2005 || Palomar || NEAT || — || align=right | 4.6 km || 
|-id=327 bgcolor=#d6d6d6
| 299327 ||  || — || August 28, 2005 || Anderson Mesa || LONEOS || EUP || align=right | 7.7 km || 
|-id=328 bgcolor=#d6d6d6
| 299328 ||  || — || August 24, 2005 || Palomar || NEAT || EOS || align=right | 2.4 km || 
|-id=329 bgcolor=#d6d6d6
| 299329 ||  || — || August 29, 2005 || Palomar || NEAT || — || align=right | 4.9 km || 
|-id=330 bgcolor=#d6d6d6
| 299330 ||  || — || August 31, 2005 || Kitt Peak || Spacewatch || HYG || align=right | 3.8 km || 
|-id=331 bgcolor=#d6d6d6
| 299331 ||  || — || August 31, 2005 || Anderson Mesa || LONEOS || EUP || align=right | 4.6 km || 
|-id=332 bgcolor=#d6d6d6
| 299332 ||  || — || August 29, 2005 || Palomar || NEAT || — || align=right | 4.1 km || 
|-id=333 bgcolor=#d6d6d6
| 299333 ||  || — || August 30, 2005 || Kitt Peak || Spacewatch || — || align=right | 3.1 km || 
|-id=334 bgcolor=#d6d6d6
| 299334 ||  || — || August 29, 2005 || Kitt Peak || Spacewatch || — || align=right | 3.5 km || 
|-id=335 bgcolor=#d6d6d6
| 299335 ||  || — || September 1, 2005 || Palomar || NEAT || EOS || align=right | 2.8 km || 
|-id=336 bgcolor=#d6d6d6
| 299336 ||  || — || September 7, 2005 || Campo Catino || CAOS || — || align=right | 4.7 km || 
|-id=337 bgcolor=#d6d6d6
| 299337 ||  || — || September 1, 2005 || Kitt Peak || Spacewatch || THB || align=right | 3.9 km || 
|-id=338 bgcolor=#d6d6d6
| 299338 ||  || — || September 13, 2005 || Kitt Peak || Spacewatch || — || align=right | 3.6 km || 
|-id=339 bgcolor=#d6d6d6
| 299339 ||  || — || September 12, 2005 || Socorro || LINEAR || URS || align=right | 5.1 km || 
|-id=340 bgcolor=#d6d6d6
| 299340 ||  || — || September 26, 2005 || Kitt Peak || Spacewatch || VER || align=right | 3.1 km || 
|-id=341 bgcolor=#d6d6d6
| 299341 ||  || — || September 26, 2005 || Kitt Peak || Spacewatch || VER || align=right | 4.6 km || 
|-id=342 bgcolor=#fefefe
| 299342 ||  || — || September 25, 2005 || Kitt Peak || Spacewatch || — || align=right data-sort-value="0.83" | 830 m || 
|-id=343 bgcolor=#d6d6d6
| 299343 ||  || — || September 29, 2005 || Anderson Mesa || LONEOS || — || align=right | 4.9 km || 
|-id=344 bgcolor=#d6d6d6
| 299344 ||  || — || September 25, 2005 || Kitt Peak || Spacewatch || THM || align=right | 2.8 km || 
|-id=345 bgcolor=#d6d6d6
| 299345 ||  || — || September 25, 2005 || Kitt Peak || Spacewatch || SYL7:4 || align=right | 4.6 km || 
|-id=346 bgcolor=#FA8072
| 299346 ||  || — || September 29, 2005 || Kitt Peak || Spacewatch || — || align=right data-sort-value="0.76" | 760 m || 
|-id=347 bgcolor=#d6d6d6
| 299347 ||  || — || September 29, 2005 || Kitt Peak || Spacewatch || 7:4 || align=right | 3.3 km || 
|-id=348 bgcolor=#d6d6d6
| 299348 ||  || — || September 29, 2005 || Anderson Mesa || LONEOS || — || align=right | 4.7 km || 
|-id=349 bgcolor=#d6d6d6
| 299349 ||  || — || September 30, 2005 || Kitt Peak || Spacewatch || 7:4 || align=right | 3.1 km || 
|-id=350 bgcolor=#d6d6d6
| 299350 ||  || — || September 30, 2005 || Kitt Peak || Spacewatch || — || align=right | 3.4 km || 
|-id=351 bgcolor=#d6d6d6
| 299351 ||  || — || September 30, 2005 || Palomar || NEAT || 7:4 || align=right | 5.3 km || 
|-id=352 bgcolor=#d6d6d6
| 299352 ||  || — || September 29, 2005 || Kitt Peak || Spacewatch || 7:4 || align=right | 3.2 km || 
|-id=353 bgcolor=#d6d6d6
| 299353 ||  || — || September 29, 2005 || Kitt Peak || Spacewatch || 7:4 || align=right | 5.7 km || 
|-id=354 bgcolor=#d6d6d6
| 299354 ||  || — || September 30, 2005 || Kitt Peak || Spacewatch || — || align=right | 3.7 km || 
|-id=355 bgcolor=#d6d6d6
| 299355 ||  || — || September 23, 2005 || Catalina || CSS || — || align=right | 4.4 km || 
|-id=356 bgcolor=#d6d6d6
| 299356 ||  || — || September 24, 2005 || Palomar || NEAT || — || align=right | 3.7 km || 
|-id=357 bgcolor=#d6d6d6
| 299357 ||  || — || September 24, 2005 || Palomar || NEAT || — || align=right | 5.8 km || 
|-id=358 bgcolor=#d6d6d6
| 299358 ||  || — || September 22, 2005 || Palomar || NEAT || — || align=right | 5.2 km || 
|-id=359 bgcolor=#d6d6d6
| 299359 ||  || — || September 24, 2005 || Anderson Mesa || LONEOS || — || align=right | 6.7 km || 
|-id=360 bgcolor=#d6d6d6
| 299360 ||  || — || September 30, 2005 || Palomar || NEAT || — || align=right | 4.4 km || 
|-id=361 bgcolor=#d6d6d6
| 299361 ||  || — || October 1, 2005 || Kitt Peak || Spacewatch || EOS || align=right | 2.8 km || 
|-id=362 bgcolor=#fefefe
| 299362 Marthacole ||  ||  || October 1, 2005 || Catalina || R. A. Kowalski || — || align=right data-sort-value="0.76" | 760 m || 
|-id=363 bgcolor=#d6d6d6
| 299363 ||  || — || October 5, 2005 || Bergisch Gladbach || W. Bickel || ALA || align=right | 3.4 km || 
|-id=364 bgcolor=#d6d6d6
| 299364 ||  || — || October 3, 2005 || Socorro || LINEAR || — || align=right | 4.7 km || 
|-id=365 bgcolor=#d6d6d6
| 299365 ||  || — || October 7, 2005 || Catalina || CSS || — || align=right | 5.5 km || 
|-id=366 bgcolor=#d6d6d6
| 299366 ||  || — || October 7, 2005 || Catalina || CSS || — || align=right | 4.5 km || 
|-id=367 bgcolor=#fefefe
| 299367 ||  || — || October 24, 2005 || Kitt Peak || Spacewatch || — || align=right data-sort-value="0.71" | 710 m || 
|-id=368 bgcolor=#d6d6d6
| 299368 ||  || — || October 22, 2005 || Kitt Peak || Spacewatch || 7:4 || align=right | 3.8 km || 
|-id=369 bgcolor=#fefefe
| 299369 ||  || — || October 24, 2005 || Kitt Peak || Spacewatch || — || align=right data-sort-value="0.61" | 610 m || 
|-id=370 bgcolor=#d6d6d6
| 299370 ||  || — || October 22, 2005 || Kitt Peak || Spacewatch || 7:4 || align=right | 3.7 km || 
|-id=371 bgcolor=#d6d6d6
| 299371 ||  || — || October 27, 2005 || Socorro || LINEAR || — || align=right | 5.2 km || 
|-id=372 bgcolor=#d6d6d6
| 299372 ||  || — || October 25, 2005 || Kitt Peak || Spacewatch || SYL7:4 || align=right | 4.7 km || 
|-id=373 bgcolor=#fefefe
| 299373 ||  || — || October 25, 2005 || Kitt Peak || Spacewatch || — || align=right data-sort-value="0.80" | 800 m || 
|-id=374 bgcolor=#fefefe
| 299374 ||  || — || October 25, 2005 || Mount Lemmon || Mount Lemmon Survey || — || align=right data-sort-value="0.94" | 940 m || 
|-id=375 bgcolor=#fefefe
| 299375 ||  || — || October 28, 2005 || Socorro || LINEAR || — || align=right data-sort-value="0.71" | 710 m || 
|-id=376 bgcolor=#fefefe
| 299376 ||  || — || October 27, 2005 || Mount Lemmon || Mount Lemmon Survey || FLO || align=right data-sort-value="0.69" | 690 m || 
|-id=377 bgcolor=#fefefe
| 299377 ||  || — || October 27, 2005 || Kitt Peak || Spacewatch || — || align=right data-sort-value="0.62" | 620 m || 
|-id=378 bgcolor=#d6d6d6
| 299378 ||  || — || October 28, 2005 || Kitt Peak || Spacewatch || 7:4 || align=right | 5.1 km || 
|-id=379 bgcolor=#d6d6d6
| 299379 ||  || — || October 27, 2005 || Anderson Mesa || LONEOS || SYL7:4 || align=right | 6.4 km || 
|-id=380 bgcolor=#fefefe
| 299380 ||  || — || October 24, 2005 || Kitt Peak || Spacewatch || — || align=right data-sort-value="0.66" | 660 m || 
|-id=381 bgcolor=#d6d6d6
| 299381 ||  || — || October 22, 2005 || Apache Point || A. C. Becker || 7:4 || align=right | 4.8 km || 
|-id=382 bgcolor=#fefefe
| 299382 ||  || — || November 5, 2005 || Catalina || CSS || — || align=right data-sort-value="0.87" | 870 m || 
|-id=383 bgcolor=#fefefe
| 299383 ||  || — || November 1, 2005 || Mount Lemmon || Mount Lemmon Survey || FLO || align=right data-sort-value="0.69" | 690 m || 
|-id=384 bgcolor=#fefefe
| 299384 ||  || — || November 6, 2005 || Mount Lemmon || Mount Lemmon Survey || — || align=right data-sort-value="0.94" | 940 m || 
|-id=385 bgcolor=#fefefe
| 299385 ||  || — || November 22, 2005 || Kitt Peak || Spacewatch || — || align=right data-sort-value="0.56" | 560 m || 
|-id=386 bgcolor=#fefefe
| 299386 ||  || — || November 21, 2005 || Kitt Peak || Spacewatch || — || align=right data-sort-value="0.66" | 660 m || 
|-id=387 bgcolor=#fefefe
| 299387 ||  || — || November 21, 2005 || Kitt Peak || Spacewatch || — || align=right data-sort-value="0.82" | 820 m || 
|-id=388 bgcolor=#fefefe
| 299388 ||  || — || November 28, 2005 || Mount Lemmon || Mount Lemmon Survey || FLO || align=right | 1.5 km || 
|-id=389 bgcolor=#fefefe
| 299389 ||  || — || November 28, 2005 || Mount Lemmon || Mount Lemmon Survey || FLO || align=right | 1.0 km || 
|-id=390 bgcolor=#d6d6d6
| 299390 ||  || — || October 1, 2005 || Mount Lemmon || Mount Lemmon Survey || EOS || align=right | 2.3 km || 
|-id=391 bgcolor=#fefefe
| 299391 ||  || — || November 25, 2005 || Mount Lemmon || Mount Lemmon Survey || — || align=right data-sort-value="0.80" | 800 m || 
|-id=392 bgcolor=#fefefe
| 299392 ||  || — || November 26, 2005 || Mount Lemmon || Mount Lemmon Survey || FLO || align=right data-sort-value="0.65" | 650 m || 
|-id=393 bgcolor=#fefefe
| 299393 ||  || — || November 29, 2005 || Catalina || CSS || — || align=right data-sort-value="0.96" | 960 m || 
|-id=394 bgcolor=#fefefe
| 299394 ||  || — || November 29, 2005 || Kitt Peak || Spacewatch || — || align=right data-sort-value="0.84" | 840 m || 
|-id=395 bgcolor=#fefefe
| 299395 ||  || — || November 29, 2005 || Kitt Peak || Spacewatch || — || align=right data-sort-value="0.79" | 790 m || 
|-id=396 bgcolor=#fefefe
| 299396 ||  || — || December 4, 2005 || Kitt Peak || Spacewatch || — || align=right data-sort-value="0.81" | 810 m || 
|-id=397 bgcolor=#fefefe
| 299397 ||  || — || December 5, 2005 || Mount Lemmon || Mount Lemmon Survey || FLO || align=right data-sort-value="0.80" | 800 m || 
|-id=398 bgcolor=#fefefe
| 299398 ||  || — || December 6, 2005 || Kitt Peak || Spacewatch || — || align=right data-sort-value="0.75" | 750 m || 
|-id=399 bgcolor=#fefefe
| 299399 ||  || — || December 8, 2005 || Kitt Peak || Spacewatch || — || align=right data-sort-value="0.63" | 630 m || 
|-id=400 bgcolor=#fefefe
| 299400 ||  || — || December 1, 2005 || Kitt Peak || M. W. Buie || — || align=right | 2.3 km || 
|}

299401–299500 

|-bgcolor=#fefefe
| 299401 ||  || — || December 22, 2005 || Kitt Peak || Spacewatch || — || align=right data-sort-value="0.64" | 640 m || 
|-id=402 bgcolor=#fefefe
| 299402 ||  || — || December 22, 2005 || Kitt Peak || Spacewatch || FLO || align=right data-sort-value="0.69" | 690 m || 
|-id=403 bgcolor=#fefefe
| 299403 ||  || — || December 22, 2005 || Kitt Peak || Spacewatch || — || align=right | 1.1 km || 
|-id=404 bgcolor=#fefefe
| 299404 ||  || — || December 22, 2005 || Kitt Peak || Spacewatch || ERI || align=right | 2.6 km || 
|-id=405 bgcolor=#fefefe
| 299405 ||  || — || December 24, 2005 || Kitt Peak || Spacewatch || V || align=right data-sort-value="0.64" | 640 m || 
|-id=406 bgcolor=#fefefe
| 299406 ||  || — || December 24, 2005 || Kitt Peak || Spacewatch || — || align=right data-sort-value="0.67" | 670 m || 
|-id=407 bgcolor=#fefefe
| 299407 ||  || — || December 25, 2005 || Kitt Peak || Spacewatch || — || align=right | 1.3 km || 
|-id=408 bgcolor=#fefefe
| 299408 ||  || — || December 25, 2005 || Kitt Peak || Spacewatch || — || align=right data-sort-value="0.85" | 850 m || 
|-id=409 bgcolor=#fefefe
| 299409 ||  || — || December 26, 2005 || Mount Lemmon || Mount Lemmon Survey || — || align=right data-sort-value="0.76" | 760 m || 
|-id=410 bgcolor=#fefefe
| 299410 ||  || — || December 24, 2005 || Kitt Peak || Spacewatch || FLO || align=right data-sort-value="0.69" | 690 m || 
|-id=411 bgcolor=#d6d6d6
| 299411 ||  || — || December 24, 2005 || Kitt Peak || Spacewatch || 3:2 || align=right | 4.0 km || 
|-id=412 bgcolor=#fefefe
| 299412 ||  || — || December 26, 2005 || Mount Lemmon || Mount Lemmon Survey || — || align=right | 2.4 km || 
|-id=413 bgcolor=#fefefe
| 299413 ||  || — || December 24, 2005 || Kitt Peak || Spacewatch || — || align=right data-sort-value="0.95" | 950 m || 
|-id=414 bgcolor=#fefefe
| 299414 ||  || — || December 24, 2005 || Kitt Peak || Spacewatch || — || align=right data-sort-value="0.96" | 960 m || 
|-id=415 bgcolor=#fefefe
| 299415 ||  || — || December 25, 2005 || Mount Lemmon || Mount Lemmon Survey || — || align=right data-sort-value="0.87" | 870 m || 
|-id=416 bgcolor=#fefefe
| 299416 ||  || — || December 26, 2005 || Mount Lemmon || Mount Lemmon Survey || NYS || align=right data-sort-value="0.72" | 720 m || 
|-id=417 bgcolor=#fefefe
| 299417 ||  || — || December 26, 2005 || Mount Lemmon || Mount Lemmon Survey || — || align=right data-sort-value="0.88" | 880 m || 
|-id=418 bgcolor=#fefefe
| 299418 ||  || — || December 27, 2005 || Kitt Peak || Spacewatch || — || align=right | 1.4 km || 
|-id=419 bgcolor=#fefefe
| 299419 ||  || — || December 25, 2005 || Kitt Peak || Spacewatch || — || align=right data-sort-value="0.71" | 710 m || 
|-id=420 bgcolor=#fefefe
| 299420 ||  || — || December 25, 2005 || Kitt Peak || Spacewatch || — || align=right data-sort-value="0.98" | 980 m || 
|-id=421 bgcolor=#d6d6d6
| 299421 ||  || — || December 25, 2005 || Kitt Peak || Spacewatch || 3:2 || align=right | 4.1 km || 
|-id=422 bgcolor=#fefefe
| 299422 ||  || — || December 27, 2005 || Kitt Peak || Spacewatch || — || align=right data-sort-value="0.79" | 790 m || 
|-id=423 bgcolor=#fefefe
| 299423 ||  || — || December 31, 2005 || Kitt Peak || Spacewatch || — || align=right | 1.0 km || 
|-id=424 bgcolor=#fefefe
| 299424 ||  || — || December 22, 2005 || Kitt Peak || Spacewatch || NYS || align=right data-sort-value="0.76" | 760 m || 
|-id=425 bgcolor=#d6d6d6
| 299425 ||  || — || December 26, 2005 || Kitt Peak || Spacewatch || 3:2 || align=right | 4.1 km || 
|-id=426 bgcolor=#fefefe
| 299426 ||  || — || December 28, 2005 || Kitt Peak || Spacewatch || — || align=right data-sort-value="0.92" | 920 m || 
|-id=427 bgcolor=#fefefe
| 299427 ||  || — || December 28, 2005 || Kitt Peak || Spacewatch || — || align=right data-sort-value="0.73" | 730 m || 
|-id=428 bgcolor=#fefefe
| 299428 ||  || — || December 25, 2005 || Mount Lemmon || Mount Lemmon Survey || NYS || align=right data-sort-value="0.69" | 690 m || 
|-id=429 bgcolor=#fefefe
| 299429 ||  || — || January 5, 2006 || Catalina || CSS || FLO || align=right data-sort-value="0.75" | 750 m || 
|-id=430 bgcolor=#fefefe
| 299430 ||  || — || January 5, 2006 || Mount Lemmon || Mount Lemmon Survey || NYS || align=right data-sort-value="0.83" | 830 m || 
|-id=431 bgcolor=#fefefe
| 299431 ||  || — || January 5, 2006 || Catalina || CSS || — || align=right data-sort-value="0.72" | 720 m || 
|-id=432 bgcolor=#fefefe
| 299432 ||  || — || January 4, 2006 || Kitt Peak || Spacewatch || — || align=right | 1.1 km || 
|-id=433 bgcolor=#fefefe
| 299433 ||  || — || January 7, 2006 || Mount Lemmon || Mount Lemmon Survey || NYS || align=right data-sort-value="0.47" | 470 m || 
|-id=434 bgcolor=#d6d6d6
| 299434 ||  || — || January 6, 2006 || Kitt Peak || Spacewatch || SHU3:2 || align=right | 7.0 km || 
|-id=435 bgcolor=#fefefe
| 299435 ||  || — || January 5, 2006 || Kitt Peak || Spacewatch || FLO || align=right data-sort-value="0.77" | 770 m || 
|-id=436 bgcolor=#fefefe
| 299436 ||  || — || January 5, 2006 || Kitt Peak || Spacewatch || NYS || align=right data-sort-value="0.73" | 730 m || 
|-id=437 bgcolor=#fefefe
| 299437 ||  || — || January 8, 2006 || Mount Lemmon || Mount Lemmon Survey || — || align=right data-sort-value="0.80" | 800 m || 
|-id=438 bgcolor=#fefefe
| 299438 ||  || — || January 4, 2006 || Kitt Peak || Spacewatch || — || align=right data-sort-value="0.53" | 530 m || 
|-id=439 bgcolor=#fefefe
| 299439 ||  || — || January 6, 2006 || Kitt Peak || Spacewatch || — || align=right data-sort-value="0.51" | 510 m || 
|-id=440 bgcolor=#fefefe
| 299440 ||  || — || January 8, 2006 || Mount Lemmon || Mount Lemmon Survey || — || align=right | 1.3 km || 
|-id=441 bgcolor=#fefefe
| 299441 ||  || — || January 4, 2006 || Kitt Peak || Spacewatch || NYS || align=right | 1.5 km || 
|-id=442 bgcolor=#fefefe
| 299442 ||  || — || January 20, 2006 || Kitt Peak || Spacewatch || NYS || align=right data-sort-value="0.64" | 640 m || 
|-id=443 bgcolor=#d6d6d6
| 299443 ||  || — || January 20, 2006 || Kitt Peak || Spacewatch || 3:2 || align=right | 4.3 km || 
|-id=444 bgcolor=#d6d6d6
| 299444 ||  || — || January 20, 2006 || Kitt Peak || Spacewatch || SHU3:2 || align=right | 7.7 km || 
|-id=445 bgcolor=#fefefe
| 299445 ||  || — || January 22, 2006 || Anderson Mesa || LONEOS || — || align=right data-sort-value="0.98" | 980 m || 
|-id=446 bgcolor=#fefefe
| 299446 ||  || — || January 23, 2006 || Mount Lemmon || Mount Lemmon Survey || — || align=right | 1.0 km || 
|-id=447 bgcolor=#C2FFFF
| 299447 ||  || — || January 22, 2006 || Mount Lemmon || Mount Lemmon Survey || L5 || align=right | 11 km || 
|-id=448 bgcolor=#fefefe
| 299448 ||  || — || January 23, 2006 || Mount Lemmon || Mount Lemmon Survey || — || align=right | 1.2 km || 
|-id=449 bgcolor=#fefefe
| 299449 ||  || — || January 23, 2006 || Mount Lemmon || Mount Lemmon Survey || — || align=right data-sort-value="0.81" | 810 m || 
|-id=450 bgcolor=#fefefe
| 299450 ||  || — || January 23, 2006 || Mount Lemmon || Mount Lemmon Survey || — || align=right | 1.2 km || 
|-id=451 bgcolor=#fefefe
| 299451 ||  || — || January 24, 2006 || Socorro || LINEAR || FLO || align=right data-sort-value="0.89" | 890 m || 
|-id=452 bgcolor=#fefefe
| 299452 ||  || — || January 25, 2006 || Kitt Peak || Spacewatch || — || align=right data-sort-value="0.71" | 710 m || 
|-id=453 bgcolor=#fefefe
| 299453 ||  || — || January 22, 2006 || Wrightwood || J. W. Young || — || align=right data-sort-value="0.87" | 870 m || 
|-id=454 bgcolor=#fefefe
| 299454 ||  || — || January 20, 2006 || Kitt Peak || Spacewatch || MAS || align=right data-sort-value="0.86" | 860 m || 
|-id=455 bgcolor=#fefefe
| 299455 ||  || — || January 25, 2006 || Kitt Peak || Spacewatch || — || align=right data-sort-value="0.79" | 790 m || 
|-id=456 bgcolor=#fefefe
| 299456 ||  || — || January 20, 2006 || Kitt Peak || Spacewatch || — || align=right | 1.2 km || 
|-id=457 bgcolor=#fefefe
| 299457 ||  || — || January 23, 2006 || Kitt Peak || Spacewatch || — || align=right data-sort-value="0.83" | 830 m || 
|-id=458 bgcolor=#fefefe
| 299458 ||  || — || January 23, 2006 || Kitt Peak || Spacewatch || FLO || align=right data-sort-value="0.98" | 980 m || 
|-id=459 bgcolor=#fefefe
| 299459 ||  || — || January 23, 2006 || Kitt Peak || Spacewatch || NYS || align=right data-sort-value="0.85" | 850 m || 
|-id=460 bgcolor=#fefefe
| 299460 ||  || — || January 23, 2006 || Kitt Peak || Spacewatch || NYS || align=right | 2.7 km || 
|-id=461 bgcolor=#fefefe
| 299461 ||  || — || January 25, 2006 || Kitt Peak || Spacewatch || MAS || align=right data-sort-value="0.81" | 810 m || 
|-id=462 bgcolor=#fefefe
| 299462 ||  || — || January 26, 2006 || Kitt Peak || Spacewatch || — || align=right data-sort-value="0.76" | 760 m || 
|-id=463 bgcolor=#fefefe
| 299463 ||  || — || January 26, 2006 || Kitt Peak || Spacewatch || FLO || align=right data-sort-value="0.96" | 960 m || 
|-id=464 bgcolor=#fefefe
| 299464 ||  || — || January 23, 2006 || Mount Lemmon || Mount Lemmon Survey || NYS || align=right data-sort-value="0.72" | 720 m || 
|-id=465 bgcolor=#C2FFFF
| 299465 ||  || — || January 23, 2006 || Junk Bond || D. Healy || L5 || align=right | 8.3 km || 
|-id=466 bgcolor=#fefefe
| 299466 ||  || — || January 25, 2006 || Kitt Peak || Spacewatch || — || align=right data-sort-value="0.83" | 830 m || 
|-id=467 bgcolor=#fefefe
| 299467 ||  || — || January 26, 2006 || Kitt Peak || Spacewatch || NYS || align=right data-sort-value="0.88" | 880 m || 
|-id=468 bgcolor=#fefefe
| 299468 ||  || — || January 26, 2006 || Kitt Peak || Spacewatch || V || align=right data-sort-value="0.69" | 690 m || 
|-id=469 bgcolor=#fefefe
| 299469 ||  || — || January 26, 2006 || Kitt Peak || Spacewatch || NYS || align=right data-sort-value="0.72" | 720 m || 
|-id=470 bgcolor=#fefefe
| 299470 ||  || — || January 26, 2006 || Kitt Peak || Spacewatch || NYS || align=right data-sort-value="0.76" | 760 m || 
|-id=471 bgcolor=#fefefe
| 299471 ||  || — || January 26, 2006 || Kitt Peak || Spacewatch || — || align=right | 1.0 km || 
|-id=472 bgcolor=#fefefe
| 299472 ||  || — || January 26, 2006 || Kitt Peak || Spacewatch || V || align=right data-sort-value="0.90" | 900 m || 
|-id=473 bgcolor=#C2FFFF
| 299473 ||  || — || January 26, 2006 || Kitt Peak || Spacewatch || L5 || align=right | 8.5 km || 
|-id=474 bgcolor=#fefefe
| 299474 ||  || — || January 28, 2006 || Mount Lemmon || Mount Lemmon Survey || — || align=right | 2.1 km || 
|-id=475 bgcolor=#fefefe
| 299475 ||  || — || January 22, 2006 || Mount Lemmon || Mount Lemmon Survey || — || align=right | 1.00 km || 
|-id=476 bgcolor=#fefefe
| 299476 ||  || — || January 28, 2006 || Mount Lemmon || Mount Lemmon Survey || NYS || align=right data-sort-value="0.90" | 900 m || 
|-id=477 bgcolor=#fefefe
| 299477 ||  || — || January 31, 2006 || 7300 Observatory || W. K. Y. Yeung || FLO || align=right data-sort-value="0.66" | 660 m || 
|-id=478 bgcolor=#fefefe
| 299478 ||  || — || January 31, 2006 || 7300 || W. K. Y. Yeung || FLO || align=right data-sort-value="0.59" | 590 m || 
|-id=479 bgcolor=#C2FFFF
| 299479 ||  || — || January 26, 2006 || Kitt Peak || Spacewatch || L5 || align=right | 8.2 km || 
|-id=480 bgcolor=#fefefe
| 299480 ||  || — || January 26, 2006 || Kitt Peak || Spacewatch || NYS || align=right data-sort-value="0.78" | 780 m || 
|-id=481 bgcolor=#fefefe
| 299481 ||  || — || January 27, 2006 || Kitt Peak || Spacewatch || — || align=right | 1.00 km || 
|-id=482 bgcolor=#fefefe
| 299482 ||  || — || January 27, 2006 || Kitt Peak || Spacewatch || NYS || align=right data-sort-value="0.77" | 770 m || 
|-id=483 bgcolor=#fefefe
| 299483 ||  || — || January 27, 2006 || Mount Lemmon || Mount Lemmon Survey || — || align=right data-sort-value="0.74" | 740 m || 
|-id=484 bgcolor=#d6d6d6
| 299484 ||  || — || January 27, 2006 || Mount Lemmon || Mount Lemmon Survey || 3:2 || align=right | 6.5 km || 
|-id=485 bgcolor=#fefefe
| 299485 ||  || — || January 28, 2006 || Mount Lemmon || Mount Lemmon Survey || — || align=right data-sort-value="0.94" | 940 m || 
|-id=486 bgcolor=#fefefe
| 299486 ||  || — || August 25, 2000 || Cerro Tololo || M. W. Buie || — || align=right data-sort-value="0.75" | 750 m || 
|-id=487 bgcolor=#fefefe
| 299487 ||  || — || January 28, 2006 || Kitt Peak || Spacewatch || FLO || align=right | 1.1 km || 
|-id=488 bgcolor=#fefefe
| 299488 ||  || — || January 30, 2006 || Catalina || CSS || ERI || align=right | 1.8 km || 
|-id=489 bgcolor=#fefefe
| 299489 ||  || — || January 30, 2006 || Kitt Peak || Spacewatch || — || align=right data-sort-value="0.95" | 950 m || 
|-id=490 bgcolor=#fefefe
| 299490 ||  || — || January 30, 2006 || Kitt Peak || Spacewatch || FLO || align=right data-sort-value="0.66" | 660 m || 
|-id=491 bgcolor=#C2FFFF
| 299491 ||  || — || January 30, 2006 || Catalina || CSS || L5 || align=right | 15 km || 
|-id=492 bgcolor=#fefefe
| 299492 ||  || — || January 31, 2006 || Kitt Peak || Spacewatch || — || align=right | 1.0 km || 
|-id=493 bgcolor=#fefefe
| 299493 ||  || — || January 31, 2006 || Kitt Peak || Spacewatch || NYS || align=right data-sort-value="0.79" | 790 m || 
|-id=494 bgcolor=#fefefe
| 299494 ||  || — || January 31, 2006 || Kitt Peak || Spacewatch || — || align=right data-sort-value="0.85" | 850 m || 
|-id=495 bgcolor=#fefefe
| 299495 ||  || — || January 30, 2006 || Kitt Peak || Spacewatch || V || align=right data-sort-value="0.94" | 940 m || 
|-id=496 bgcolor=#fefefe
| 299496 ||  || — || January 30, 2006 || Kitt Peak || Spacewatch || FLO || align=right data-sort-value="0.60" | 600 m || 
|-id=497 bgcolor=#fefefe
| 299497 ||  || — || January 30, 2006 || Kitt Peak || Spacewatch || MAS || align=right data-sort-value="0.68" | 680 m || 
|-id=498 bgcolor=#fefefe
| 299498 ||  || — || January 30, 2006 || Kitt Peak || Spacewatch || — || align=right data-sort-value="0.58" | 580 m || 
|-id=499 bgcolor=#fefefe
| 299499 ||  || — || January 30, 2006 || Kitt Peak || Spacewatch || MAS || align=right data-sort-value="0.83" | 830 m || 
|-id=500 bgcolor=#fefefe
| 299500 ||  || — || January 31, 2006 || Kitt Peak || Spacewatch || — || align=right data-sort-value="0.82" | 820 m || 
|}

299501–299600 

|-bgcolor=#fefefe
| 299501 ||  || — || January 31, 2006 || Kitt Peak || Spacewatch || — || align=right | 1.0 km || 
|-id=502 bgcolor=#fefefe
| 299502 ||  || — || January 31, 2006 || Kitt Peak || Spacewatch || MAS || align=right | 1.1 km || 
|-id=503 bgcolor=#fefefe
| 299503 ||  || — || January 31, 2006 || Kitt Peak || Spacewatch || EUT || align=right data-sort-value="0.86" | 860 m || 
|-id=504 bgcolor=#fefefe
| 299504 ||  || — || January 31, 2006 || Kitt Peak || Spacewatch || MAS || align=right data-sort-value="0.74" | 740 m || 
|-id=505 bgcolor=#fefefe
| 299505 ||  || — || January 27, 2006 || Catalina || CSS || — || align=right | 1.1 km || 
|-id=506 bgcolor=#fefefe
| 299506 ||  || — || February 1, 2006 || Mount Lemmon || Mount Lemmon Survey || — || align=right | 1.0 km || 
|-id=507 bgcolor=#fefefe
| 299507 ||  || — || February 1, 2006 || Mount Lemmon || Mount Lemmon Survey || V || align=right data-sort-value="0.83" | 830 m || 
|-id=508 bgcolor=#fefefe
| 299508 ||  || — || February 1, 2006 || Mount Lemmon || Mount Lemmon Survey || NYS || align=right data-sort-value="0.71" | 710 m || 
|-id=509 bgcolor=#fefefe
| 299509 ||  || — || February 7, 2006 || Wrightwood || J. W. Young || — || align=right | 1.0 km || 
|-id=510 bgcolor=#fefefe
| 299510 ||  || — || February 1, 2006 || Kitt Peak || Spacewatch || V || align=right data-sort-value="0.99" | 990 m || 
|-id=511 bgcolor=#C2FFFF
| 299511 ||  || — || February 1, 2006 || Kitt Peak || Spacewatch || L5 || align=right | 15 km || 
|-id=512 bgcolor=#fefefe
| 299512 ||  || — || February 1, 2006 || Mount Lemmon || Mount Lemmon Survey || V || align=right data-sort-value="0.60" | 600 m || 
|-id=513 bgcolor=#fefefe
| 299513 ||  || — || February 2, 2006 || Kitt Peak || Spacewatch || — || align=right | 1.1 km || 
|-id=514 bgcolor=#fefefe
| 299514 ||  || — || February 2, 2006 || Kitt Peak || Spacewatch || — || align=right data-sort-value="0.65" | 650 m || 
|-id=515 bgcolor=#fefefe
| 299515 ||  || — || February 3, 2006 || Kitt Peak || Spacewatch || NYS || align=right data-sort-value="0.77" | 770 m || 
|-id=516 bgcolor=#fefefe
| 299516 ||  || — || February 3, 2006 || Socorro || LINEAR || V || align=right data-sort-value="0.76" | 760 m || 
|-id=517 bgcolor=#fefefe
| 299517 ||  || — || February 4, 2006 || Mount Lemmon || Mount Lemmon Survey || — || align=right | 1.3 km || 
|-id=518 bgcolor=#fefefe
| 299518 ||  || — || February 2, 2006 || Mauna Kea || P. A. Wiegert || — || align=right data-sort-value="0.84" | 840 m || 
|-id=519 bgcolor=#fefefe
| 299519 ||  || — || February 3, 2006 || Kitt Peak || Spacewatch || MAS || align=right data-sort-value="0.80" | 800 m || 
|-id=520 bgcolor=#fefefe
| 299520 ||  || — || February 6, 2006 || Mount Lemmon || Mount Lemmon Survey || MAS || align=right data-sort-value="0.86" | 860 m || 
|-id=521 bgcolor=#fefefe
| 299521 ||  || — || February 20, 2006 || Kitt Peak || Spacewatch || — || align=right | 1.1 km || 
|-id=522 bgcolor=#fefefe
| 299522 ||  || — || February 20, 2006 || Kitt Peak || Spacewatch || V || align=right data-sort-value="0.88" | 880 m || 
|-id=523 bgcolor=#C2FFFF
| 299523 ||  || — || February 20, 2006 || Kitt Peak || Spacewatch || L5 || align=right | 12 km || 
|-id=524 bgcolor=#C2FFFF
| 299524 ||  || — || February 20, 2006 || Kitt Peak || Spacewatch || L5 || align=right | 9.2 km || 
|-id=525 bgcolor=#fefefe
| 299525 ||  || — || February 20, 2006 || Kitt Peak || Spacewatch || NYS || align=right data-sort-value="0.86" | 860 m || 
|-id=526 bgcolor=#fefefe
| 299526 ||  || — || February 20, 2006 || Kitt Peak || Spacewatch || — || align=right data-sort-value="0.98" | 980 m || 
|-id=527 bgcolor=#fefefe
| 299527 ||  || — || February 20, 2006 || Catalina || CSS || — || align=right | 1.2 km || 
|-id=528 bgcolor=#fefefe
| 299528 ||  || — || February 20, 2006 || Mount Lemmon || Mount Lemmon Survey || — || align=right data-sort-value="0.82" | 820 m || 
|-id=529 bgcolor=#fefefe
| 299529 ||  || — || February 20, 2006 || Kitt Peak || Spacewatch || FLO || align=right data-sort-value="0.83" | 830 m || 
|-id=530 bgcolor=#fefefe
| 299530 ||  || — || February 20, 2006 || Socorro || LINEAR || PHO || align=right | 2.4 km || 
|-id=531 bgcolor=#fefefe
| 299531 ||  || — || February 20, 2006 || Mount Lemmon || Mount Lemmon Survey || — || align=right | 1.5 km || 
|-id=532 bgcolor=#fefefe
| 299532 ||  || — || February 20, 2006 || Mount Lemmon || Mount Lemmon Survey || NYS || align=right data-sort-value="0.75" | 750 m || 
|-id=533 bgcolor=#fefefe
| 299533 ||  || — || February 20, 2006 || Mount Lemmon || Mount Lemmon Survey || MAS || align=right data-sort-value="0.88" | 880 m || 
|-id=534 bgcolor=#fefefe
| 299534 ||  || — || February 20, 2006 || Kitt Peak || Spacewatch || — || align=right | 1.1 km || 
|-id=535 bgcolor=#fefefe
| 299535 ||  || — || February 22, 2006 || Palomar || NEAT || — || align=right | 1.4 km || 
|-id=536 bgcolor=#fefefe
| 299536 ||  || — || February 21, 2006 || Mount Lemmon || Mount Lemmon Survey || — || align=right data-sort-value="0.70" | 700 m || 
|-id=537 bgcolor=#C2FFFF
| 299537 ||  || — || February 22, 2006 || Catalina || CSS || L5 || align=right | 11 km || 
|-id=538 bgcolor=#fefefe
| 299538 ||  || — || February 22, 2006 || Catalina || CSS || — || align=right | 1.8 km || 
|-id=539 bgcolor=#fefefe
| 299539 ||  || — || February 24, 2006 || Kitt Peak || Spacewatch || — || align=right | 1.0 km || 
|-id=540 bgcolor=#fefefe
| 299540 ||  || — || February 24, 2006 || Mount Lemmon || Mount Lemmon Survey || — || align=right data-sort-value="0.83" | 830 m || 
|-id=541 bgcolor=#fefefe
| 299541 ||  || — || February 24, 2006 || Kitt Peak || Spacewatch || MAS || align=right data-sort-value="0.90" | 900 m || 
|-id=542 bgcolor=#fefefe
| 299542 ||  || — || February 24, 2006 || Kitt Peak || Spacewatch || NYS || align=right data-sort-value="0.73" | 730 m || 
|-id=543 bgcolor=#fefefe
| 299543 ||  || — || February 24, 2006 || Kitt Peak || Spacewatch || — || align=right | 2.6 km || 
|-id=544 bgcolor=#fefefe
| 299544 ||  || — || February 24, 2006 || Kitt Peak || Spacewatch || V || align=right data-sort-value="0.80" | 800 m || 
|-id=545 bgcolor=#fefefe
| 299545 ||  || — || February 24, 2006 || Kitt Peak || Spacewatch || — || align=right | 1.0 km || 
|-id=546 bgcolor=#fefefe
| 299546 ||  || — || February 24, 2006 || Kitt Peak || Spacewatch || — || align=right data-sort-value="0.75" | 750 m || 
|-id=547 bgcolor=#C2FFFF
| 299547 ||  || — || February 25, 2006 || Kitt Peak || Spacewatch || L5 || align=right | 11 km || 
|-id=548 bgcolor=#fefefe
| 299548 ||  || — || February 28, 2006 || Mount Lemmon || Mount Lemmon Survey || V || align=right data-sort-value="0.79" | 790 m || 
|-id=549 bgcolor=#fefefe
| 299549 ||  || — || February 28, 2006 || Socorro || LINEAR || — || align=right | 1.2 km || 
|-id=550 bgcolor=#fefefe
| 299550 ||  || — || February 21, 2006 || Catalina || CSS || FLO || align=right data-sort-value="0.87" | 870 m || 
|-id=551 bgcolor=#C2FFFF
| 299551 ||  || — || February 25, 2006 || Kitt Peak || Spacewatch || L5 || align=right | 9.4 km || 
|-id=552 bgcolor=#C2FFFF
| 299552 ||  || — || February 25, 2006 || Mount Lemmon || Mount Lemmon Survey || L5 || align=right | 8.5 km || 
|-id=553 bgcolor=#fefefe
| 299553 ||  || — || February 25, 2006 || Kitt Peak || Spacewatch || NYS || align=right data-sort-value="0.86" | 860 m || 
|-id=554 bgcolor=#fefefe
| 299554 ||  || — || February 25, 2006 || Kitt Peak || Spacewatch || — || align=right data-sort-value="0.89" | 890 m || 
|-id=555 bgcolor=#fefefe
| 299555 ||  || — || February 25, 2006 || Kitt Peak || Spacewatch || NYS || align=right data-sort-value="0.75" | 750 m || 
|-id=556 bgcolor=#fefefe
| 299556 ||  || — || February 25, 2006 || Mount Lemmon || Mount Lemmon Survey || NYS || align=right data-sort-value="0.71" | 710 m || 
|-id=557 bgcolor=#fefefe
| 299557 ||  || — || February 25, 2006 || Kitt Peak || Spacewatch || — || align=right data-sort-value="0.82" | 820 m || 
|-id=558 bgcolor=#fefefe
| 299558 ||  || — || February 25, 2006 || Kitt Peak || Spacewatch || FLO || align=right | 1.0 km || 
|-id=559 bgcolor=#fefefe
| 299559 ||  || — || February 27, 2006 || Kitt Peak || Spacewatch || NYS || align=right data-sort-value="0.86" | 860 m || 
|-id=560 bgcolor=#fefefe
| 299560 ||  || — || February 27, 2006 || Kitt Peak || Spacewatch || V || align=right data-sort-value="0.80" | 800 m || 
|-id=561 bgcolor=#fefefe
| 299561 ||  || — || February 27, 2006 || Kitt Peak || Spacewatch || NYS || align=right data-sort-value="0.78" | 780 m || 
|-id=562 bgcolor=#fefefe
| 299562 ||  || — || February 27, 2006 || Mount Lemmon || Mount Lemmon Survey || V || align=right data-sort-value="0.74" | 740 m || 
|-id=563 bgcolor=#fefefe
| 299563 ||  || — || February 27, 2006 || Kitt Peak || Spacewatch || — || align=right data-sort-value="0.98" | 980 m || 
|-id=564 bgcolor=#fefefe
| 299564 ||  || — || February 27, 2006 || Kitt Peak || Spacewatch || — || align=right | 1.2 km || 
|-id=565 bgcolor=#fefefe
| 299565 ||  || — || February 27, 2006 || Kitt Peak || Spacewatch || V || align=right | 1.1 km || 
|-id=566 bgcolor=#fefefe
| 299566 ||  || — || February 27, 2006 || Kitt Peak || Spacewatch || V || align=right | 1.1 km || 
|-id=567 bgcolor=#fefefe
| 299567 ||  || — || February 23, 2006 || Anderson Mesa || LONEOS || V || align=right data-sort-value="0.95" | 950 m || 
|-id=568 bgcolor=#E9E9E9
| 299568 ||  || — || February 25, 2006 || Kitt Peak || Spacewatch || — || align=right data-sort-value="0.98" | 980 m || 
|-id=569 bgcolor=#fefefe
| 299569 ||  || — || February 24, 2006 || Kitt Peak || Spacewatch || NYS || align=right data-sort-value="0.82" | 820 m || 
|-id=570 bgcolor=#fefefe
| 299570 ||  || — || February 25, 2006 || Mount Lemmon || Mount Lemmon Survey || V || align=right data-sort-value="0.67" | 670 m || 
|-id=571 bgcolor=#fefefe
| 299571 ||  || — || March 3, 2006 || Nyukasa || Mount Nyukasa Stn. || — || align=right data-sort-value="0.86" | 860 m || 
|-id=572 bgcolor=#C2FFFF
| 299572 ||  || — || March 3, 2006 || Kitt Peak || Spacewatch || L5 || align=right | 16 km || 
|-id=573 bgcolor=#fefefe
| 299573 ||  || — || March 4, 2006 || Kitt Peak || Spacewatch || — || align=right | 1.0 km || 
|-id=574 bgcolor=#fefefe
| 299574 ||  || — || March 3, 2006 || Kitt Peak || Spacewatch || NYS || align=right data-sort-value="0.74" | 740 m || 
|-id=575 bgcolor=#C2FFFF
| 299575 ||  || — || March 5, 2006 || Kitt Peak || Spacewatch || L5 || align=right | 11 km || 
|-id=576 bgcolor=#fefefe
| 299576 ||  || — || March 5, 2006 || Kitt Peak || Spacewatch || V || align=right data-sort-value="0.72" | 720 m || 
|-id=577 bgcolor=#fefefe
| 299577 ||  || — || March 23, 2006 || Mount Lemmon || Mount Lemmon Survey || — || align=right | 1.2 km || 
|-id=578 bgcolor=#fefefe
| 299578 ||  || — || March 25, 2006 || Mount Lemmon || Mount Lemmon Survey || — || align=right | 1.3 km || 
|-id=579 bgcolor=#fefefe
| 299579 ||  || — || March 23, 2006 || Kitt Peak || Spacewatch || V || align=right data-sort-value="0.92" | 920 m || 
|-id=580 bgcolor=#fefefe
| 299580 ||  || — || March 26, 2006 || Kitt Peak || Spacewatch || — || align=right data-sort-value="0.86" | 860 m || 
|-id=581 bgcolor=#E9E9E9
| 299581 ||  || — || March 26, 2006 || Mount Lemmon || Mount Lemmon Survey || — || align=right | 1.3 km || 
|-id=582 bgcolor=#FFC2E0
| 299582 ||  || — || April 6, 2006 || Catalina || CSS || APO +1km || align=right data-sort-value="0.62" | 620 m || 
|-id=583 bgcolor=#E9E9E9
| 299583 ||  || — || April 2, 2006 || Kitt Peak || Spacewatch || — || align=right | 1.2 km || 
|-id=584 bgcolor=#E9E9E9
| 299584 ||  || — || April 2, 2006 || Kitt Peak || Spacewatch || — || align=right data-sort-value="0.82" | 820 m || 
|-id=585 bgcolor=#fefefe
| 299585 ||  || — || April 2, 2006 || Kitt Peak || Spacewatch || V || align=right data-sort-value="0.80" | 800 m || 
|-id=586 bgcolor=#fefefe
| 299586 ||  || — || April 2, 2006 || Kitt Peak || Spacewatch || V || align=right data-sort-value="0.75" | 750 m || 
|-id=587 bgcolor=#E9E9E9
| 299587 ||  || — || April 2, 2006 || Kitt Peak || Spacewatch || — || align=right data-sort-value="0.86" | 860 m || 
|-id=588 bgcolor=#E9E9E9
| 299588 ||  || — || April 2, 2006 || Kitt Peak || Spacewatch || — || align=right data-sort-value="0.90" | 900 m || 
|-id=589 bgcolor=#E9E9E9
| 299589 ||  || — || April 7, 2006 || Catalina || CSS || — || align=right | 1.6 km || 
|-id=590 bgcolor=#E9E9E9
| 299590 ||  || — || April 19, 2006 || Kitt Peak || Spacewatch || — || align=right | 1.9 km || 
|-id=591 bgcolor=#E9E9E9
| 299591 ||  || — || April 19, 2006 || Kitt Peak || Spacewatch || — || align=right | 1.7 km || 
|-id=592 bgcolor=#fefefe
| 299592 ||  || — || April 21, 2006 || Kitt Peak || Spacewatch || — || align=right | 1.0 km || 
|-id=593 bgcolor=#fefefe
| 299593 ||  || — || April 19, 2006 || Anderson Mesa || LONEOS || — || align=right | 1.4 km || 
|-id=594 bgcolor=#fefefe
| 299594 ||  || — || April 19, 2006 || Mount Lemmon || Mount Lemmon Survey || — || align=right data-sort-value="0.85" | 850 m || 
|-id=595 bgcolor=#E9E9E9
| 299595 ||  || — || April 19, 2006 || Mount Lemmon || Mount Lemmon Survey || — || align=right | 1.8 km || 
|-id=596 bgcolor=#E9E9E9
| 299596 ||  || — || April 20, 2006 || Kitt Peak || Spacewatch || — || align=right | 3.1 km || 
|-id=597 bgcolor=#E9E9E9
| 299597 ||  || — || April 21, 2006 || Siding Spring || SSS || — || align=right | 1.7 km || 
|-id=598 bgcolor=#fefefe
| 299598 ||  || — || April 25, 2006 || Kitt Peak || Spacewatch || MAS || align=right data-sort-value="0.90" | 900 m || 
|-id=599 bgcolor=#fefefe
| 299599 ||  || — || April 26, 2006 || Mount Lemmon || Mount Lemmon Survey || — || align=right | 1.3 km || 
|-id=600 bgcolor=#E9E9E9
| 299600 ||  || — || April 24, 2006 || Kitt Peak || Spacewatch || — || align=right | 1.4 km || 
|}

299601–299700 

|-bgcolor=#E9E9E9
| 299601 ||  || — || April 24, 2006 || Mount Lemmon || Mount Lemmon Survey || — || align=right | 1.4 km || 
|-id=602 bgcolor=#E9E9E9
| 299602 ||  || — || April 25, 2006 || Kitt Peak || Spacewatch || — || align=right | 2.4 km || 
|-id=603 bgcolor=#E9E9E9
| 299603 ||  || — || April 25, 2006 || Kitt Peak || Spacewatch || EUN || align=right | 1.1 km || 
|-id=604 bgcolor=#fefefe
| 299604 ||  || — || April 25, 2006 || Kitt Peak || Spacewatch || V || align=right data-sort-value="0.99" | 990 m || 
|-id=605 bgcolor=#E9E9E9
| 299605 ||  || — || April 25, 2006 || Kitt Peak || Spacewatch || — || align=right | 2.4 km || 
|-id=606 bgcolor=#fefefe
| 299606 ||  || — || April 26, 2006 || Kitt Peak || Spacewatch || — || align=right data-sort-value="0.94" | 940 m || 
|-id=607 bgcolor=#E9E9E9
| 299607 ||  || — || April 26, 2006 || Kitt Peak || Spacewatch || — || align=right data-sort-value="0.94" | 940 m || 
|-id=608 bgcolor=#E9E9E9
| 299608 ||  || — || April 26, 2006 || Kitt Peak || Spacewatch || — || align=right | 1.2 km || 
|-id=609 bgcolor=#E9E9E9
| 299609 ||  || — || April 30, 2006 || Kitt Peak || Spacewatch || — || align=right data-sort-value="0.89" | 890 m || 
|-id=610 bgcolor=#E9E9E9
| 299610 ||  || — || April 30, 2006 || Catalina || CSS || — || align=right | 2.0 km || 
|-id=611 bgcolor=#E9E9E9
| 299611 ||  || — || April 26, 2006 || Anderson Mesa || LONEOS || JUN || align=right | 3.1 km || 
|-id=612 bgcolor=#E9E9E9
| 299612 ||  || — || April 29, 2006 || Kitt Peak || Spacewatch || — || align=right | 1.8 km || 
|-id=613 bgcolor=#E9E9E9
| 299613 ||  || — || April 29, 2006 || Kitt Peak || Spacewatch || AER || align=right | 1.5 km || 
|-id=614 bgcolor=#E9E9E9
| 299614 ||  || — || April 30, 2006 || Kitt Peak || Spacewatch || — || align=right data-sort-value="0.95" | 950 m || 
|-id=615 bgcolor=#E9E9E9
| 299615 ||  || — || April 24, 2006 || Siding Spring || SSS || — || align=right | 5.5 km || 
|-id=616 bgcolor=#E9E9E9
| 299616 ||  || — || May 2, 2006 || Mount Lemmon || Mount Lemmon Survey || — || align=right | 1.8 km || 
|-id=617 bgcolor=#E9E9E9
| 299617 ||  || — || May 1, 2006 || Kitt Peak || Spacewatch || — || align=right | 1.2 km || 
|-id=618 bgcolor=#fefefe
| 299618 ||  || — || May 1, 2006 || Kitt Peak || Spacewatch || — || align=right | 1.1 km || 
|-id=619 bgcolor=#E9E9E9
| 299619 ||  || — || May 2, 2006 || Kitt Peak || Spacewatch || — || align=right data-sort-value="0.97" | 970 m || 
|-id=620 bgcolor=#fefefe
| 299620 ||  || — || May 5, 2006 || Mount Lemmon || Mount Lemmon Survey || MAS || align=right data-sort-value="0.93" | 930 m || 
|-id=621 bgcolor=#E9E9E9
| 299621 ||  || — || May 3, 2006 || Kitt Peak || Spacewatch || — || align=right | 1.00 km || 
|-id=622 bgcolor=#E9E9E9
| 299622 ||  || — || May 3, 2006 || Kitt Peak || Spacewatch || — || align=right | 1.9 km || 
|-id=623 bgcolor=#fefefe
| 299623 ||  || — || May 4, 2006 || Kitt Peak || Spacewatch || — || align=right | 1.00 km || 
|-id=624 bgcolor=#E9E9E9
| 299624 ||  || — || May 4, 2006 || Kitt Peak || Spacewatch || — || align=right | 1.5 km || 
|-id=625 bgcolor=#E9E9E9
| 299625 ||  || — || May 5, 2006 || Kitt Peak || Spacewatch || — || align=right | 1.1 km || 
|-id=626 bgcolor=#fefefe
| 299626 ||  || — || May 2, 2006 || Mount Lemmon || Mount Lemmon Survey || — || align=right | 1.3 km || 
|-id=627 bgcolor=#E9E9E9
| 299627 ||  || — || May 8, 2006 || Mount Lemmon || Mount Lemmon Survey || — || align=right | 1.8 km || 
|-id=628 bgcolor=#E9E9E9
| 299628 ||  || — || May 1, 2006 || Catalina || CSS || EUN || align=right | 1.5 km || 
|-id=629 bgcolor=#E9E9E9
| 299629 ||  || — || May 2, 2006 || Kitt Peak || M. W. Buie || — || align=right | 1.2 km || 
|-id=630 bgcolor=#E9E9E9
| 299630 ||  || — || May 1, 2006 || Kitt Peak || M. W. Buie || — || align=right | 1.3 km || 
|-id=631 bgcolor=#fefefe
| 299631 ||  || — || May 1, 2006 || Mauna Kea || P. A. Wiegert || V || align=right data-sort-value="0.74" | 740 m || 
|-id=632 bgcolor=#E9E9E9
| 299632 ||  || — || May 18, 2006 || Palomar || NEAT || — || align=right | 1.4 km || 
|-id=633 bgcolor=#E9E9E9
| 299633 ||  || — || May 19, 2006 || Mount Lemmon || Mount Lemmon Survey || — || align=right | 1.0 km || 
|-id=634 bgcolor=#E9E9E9
| 299634 ||  || — || May 19, 2006 || Mount Lemmon || Mount Lemmon Survey || JUN || align=right | 1.3 km || 
|-id=635 bgcolor=#E9E9E9
| 299635 ||  || — || May 20, 2006 || Palomar || NEAT || — || align=right | 1.7 km || 
|-id=636 bgcolor=#E9E9E9
| 299636 ||  || — || May 21, 2006 || Kitt Peak || Spacewatch || — || align=right | 1.3 km || 
|-id=637 bgcolor=#E9E9E9
| 299637 ||  || — || May 20, 2006 || Kitt Peak || Spacewatch || — || align=right | 1.3 km || 
|-id=638 bgcolor=#E9E9E9
| 299638 ||  || — || May 20, 2006 || Catalina || CSS || — || align=right | 1.3 km || 
|-id=639 bgcolor=#E9E9E9
| 299639 ||  || — || May 20, 2006 || Kitt Peak || Spacewatch || — || align=right | 2.6 km || 
|-id=640 bgcolor=#fefefe
| 299640 ||  || — || May 21, 2006 || Mount Lemmon || Mount Lemmon Survey || NYS || align=right | 1.0 km || 
|-id=641 bgcolor=#E9E9E9
| 299641 ||  || — || May 21, 2006 || Kitt Peak || Spacewatch || — || align=right | 2.9 km || 
|-id=642 bgcolor=#E9E9E9
| 299642 ||  || — || May 22, 2006 || Kitt Peak || Spacewatch || — || align=right | 2.4 km || 
|-id=643 bgcolor=#E9E9E9
| 299643 ||  || — || May 22, 2006 || Kitt Peak || Spacewatch || — || align=right | 2.3 km || 
|-id=644 bgcolor=#E9E9E9
| 299644 ||  || — || May 24, 2006 || Kitt Peak || Spacewatch || — || align=right | 2.3 km || 
|-id=645 bgcolor=#E9E9E9
| 299645 ||  || — || May 23, 2006 || Kitt Peak || Spacewatch || — || align=right | 1.7 km || 
|-id=646 bgcolor=#E9E9E9
| 299646 ||  || — || May 22, 2006 || Kitt Peak || Spacewatch || — || align=right | 2.2 km || 
|-id=647 bgcolor=#E9E9E9
| 299647 ||  || — || May 24, 2006 || Mount Lemmon || Mount Lemmon Survey || — || align=right data-sort-value="0.76" | 760 m || 
|-id=648 bgcolor=#E9E9E9
| 299648 ||  || — || May 27, 2006 || Needville || Needville Obs. || JUN || align=right | 1.1 km || 
|-id=649 bgcolor=#E9E9E9
| 299649 ||  || — || May 25, 2006 || Kitt Peak || Spacewatch || — || align=right | 1.6 km || 
|-id=650 bgcolor=#E9E9E9
| 299650 ||  || — || May 25, 2006 || Kitt Peak || Spacewatch || — || align=right | 3.2 km || 
|-id=651 bgcolor=#E9E9E9
| 299651 ||  || — || May 29, 2006 || Reedy Creek || J. Broughton || — || align=right | 2.3 km || 
|-id=652 bgcolor=#E9E9E9
| 299652 ||  || — || May 29, 2006 || Kitt Peak || Spacewatch || — || align=right | 2.0 km || 
|-id=653 bgcolor=#E9E9E9
| 299653 ||  || — || May 23, 2006 || Siding Spring || SSS || EUN || align=right | 1.6 km || 
|-id=654 bgcolor=#E9E9E9
| 299654 ||  || — || June 4, 2006 || Kitt Peak || Spacewatch || — || align=right | 3.1 km || 
|-id=655 bgcolor=#E9E9E9
| 299655 ||  || — || June 16, 2006 || Kitt Peak || Spacewatch || — || align=right | 1.6 km || 
|-id=656 bgcolor=#E9E9E9
| 299656 ||  || — || June 16, 2006 || Palomar || NEAT || — || align=right | 1.5 km || 
|-id=657 bgcolor=#E9E9E9
| 299657 ||  || — || June 18, 2006 || Kitt Peak || Spacewatch || — || align=right | 2.8 km || 
|-id=658 bgcolor=#d6d6d6
| 299658 ||  || — || July 18, 2006 || Bergisch Gladbac || W. Bickel || — || align=right | 3.3 km || 
|-id=659 bgcolor=#E9E9E9
| 299659 ||  || — || July 20, 2006 || Siding Spring || SSS || — || align=right | 3.2 km || 
|-id=660 bgcolor=#E9E9E9
| 299660 ||  || — || July 31, 2006 || Siding Spring || SSS || DOR || align=right | 2.4 km || 
|-id=661 bgcolor=#E9E9E9
| 299661 ||  || — || July 25, 2006 || Mount Lemmon || Mount Lemmon Survey || AGN || align=right | 1.9 km || 
|-id=662 bgcolor=#d6d6d6
| 299662 ||  || — || July 22, 2006 || Mount Lemmon || Mount Lemmon Survey || KOR || align=right | 1.6 km || 
|-id=663 bgcolor=#d6d6d6
| 299663 ||  || — || July 29, 2006 || Siding Spring || SSS || BRA || align=right | 2.1 km || 
|-id=664 bgcolor=#E9E9E9
| 299664 ||  || — || August 15, 2006 || Reedy Creek || J. Broughton || DOR || align=right | 4.2 km || 
|-id=665 bgcolor=#d6d6d6
| 299665 ||  || — || August 12, 2006 || Palomar || NEAT || BRA || align=right | 2.3 km || 
|-id=666 bgcolor=#E9E9E9
| 299666 ||  || — || August 13, 2006 || Palomar || NEAT || HOF || align=right | 3.1 km || 
|-id=667 bgcolor=#E9E9E9
| 299667 ||  || — || August 14, 2006 || Palomar || NEAT || — || align=right | 3.1 km || 
|-id=668 bgcolor=#E9E9E9
| 299668 ||  || — || August 17, 2006 || Palomar || NEAT || — || align=right | 2.7 km || 
|-id=669 bgcolor=#E9E9E9
| 299669 ||  || — || August 17, 2006 || Palomar || NEAT || — || align=right | 3.4 km || 
|-id=670 bgcolor=#E9E9E9
| 299670 ||  || — || August 19, 2006 || Kitt Peak || Spacewatch || — || align=right | 3.3 km || 
|-id=671 bgcolor=#E9E9E9
| 299671 ||  || — || August 17, 2006 || Palomar || NEAT || — || align=right | 3.0 km || 
|-id=672 bgcolor=#E9E9E9
| 299672 ||  || — || August 17, 2006 || Palomar || NEAT || — || align=right | 3.2 km || 
|-id=673 bgcolor=#E9E9E9
| 299673 ||  || — || August 17, 2006 || Palomar || NEAT || DOR || align=right | 3.1 km || 
|-id=674 bgcolor=#E9E9E9
| 299674 ||  || — || August 19, 2006 || Anderson Mesa || LONEOS || — || align=right | 2.4 km || 
|-id=675 bgcolor=#d6d6d6
| 299675 ||  || — || August 20, 2006 || Palomar || NEAT || FIR || align=right | 4.1 km || 
|-id=676 bgcolor=#E9E9E9
| 299676 ||  || — || August 19, 2006 || Palomar || NEAT || DOR || align=right | 3.3 km || 
|-id=677 bgcolor=#d6d6d6
| 299677 ||  || — || August 17, 2006 || Palomar || NEAT || — || align=right | 3.6 km || 
|-id=678 bgcolor=#E9E9E9
| 299678 ||  || — || August 20, 2006 || Palomar || NEAT || DOR || align=right | 3.6 km || 
|-id=679 bgcolor=#E9E9E9
| 299679 ||  || — || August 22, 2006 || Palomar || NEAT || — || align=right | 2.8 km || 
|-id=680 bgcolor=#d6d6d6
| 299680 ||  || — || August 21, 2006 || Kitt Peak || Spacewatch || KOR || align=right | 1.7 km || 
|-id=681 bgcolor=#d6d6d6
| 299681 ||  || — || August 21, 2006 || Kitt Peak || Spacewatch || — || align=right | 3.0 km || 
|-id=682 bgcolor=#E9E9E9
| 299682 ||  || — || August 24, 2006 || Socorro || LINEAR || — || align=right | 3.3 km || 
|-id=683 bgcolor=#E9E9E9
| 299683 ||  || — || August 24, 2006 || Palomar || NEAT || — || align=right | 3.1 km || 
|-id=684 bgcolor=#E9E9E9
| 299684 ||  || — || August 27, 2006 || Kitt Peak || Spacewatch || — || align=right | 2.6 km || 
|-id=685 bgcolor=#E9E9E9
| 299685 ||  || — || August 16, 2006 || Palomar || NEAT || — || align=right | 2.9 km || 
|-id=686 bgcolor=#E9E9E9
| 299686 ||  || — || August 16, 2006 || Palomar || NEAT || — || align=right | 2.2 km || 
|-id=687 bgcolor=#d6d6d6
| 299687 ||  || — || August 16, 2006 || Palomar || NEAT || TRP || align=right | 4.9 km || 
|-id=688 bgcolor=#d6d6d6
| 299688 ||  || — || August 24, 2006 || Palomar || NEAT || — || align=right | 2.4 km || 
|-id=689 bgcolor=#d6d6d6
| 299689 ||  || — || August 26, 2006 || Socorro || LINEAR || — || align=right | 5.3 km || 
|-id=690 bgcolor=#E9E9E9
| 299690 ||  || — || August 28, 2006 || Kitt Peak || Spacewatch || HOF || align=right | 3.0 km || 
|-id=691 bgcolor=#E9E9E9
| 299691 ||  || — || August 28, 2006 || Catalina || CSS || — || align=right | 2.6 km || 
|-id=692 bgcolor=#d6d6d6
| 299692 ||  || — || August 28, 2006 || Anderson Mesa || LONEOS || — || align=right | 3.4 km || 
|-id=693 bgcolor=#d6d6d6
| 299693 ||  || — || August 30, 2006 || Wrightwood || J. W. Young || — || align=right | 5.0 km || 
|-id=694 bgcolor=#E9E9E9
| 299694 ||  || — || August 29, 2006 || Catalina || CSS || GEF || align=right | 1.6 km || 
|-id=695 bgcolor=#E9E9E9
| 299695 ||  || — || August 24, 2006 || Socorro || LINEAR || MRX || align=right | 1.4 km || 
|-id=696 bgcolor=#E9E9E9
| 299696 ||  || — || August 17, 2006 || Palomar || NEAT || — || align=right | 3.4 km || 
|-id=697 bgcolor=#E9E9E9
| 299697 ||  || — || October 8, 2002 || Anderson Mesa || LONEOS || PAD || align=right | 2.3 km || 
|-id=698 bgcolor=#d6d6d6
| 299698 ||  || — || August 18, 2006 || Kitt Peak || Spacewatch || LAU || align=right | 1.2 km || 
|-id=699 bgcolor=#d6d6d6
| 299699 ||  || — || August 18, 2006 || Kitt Peak || Spacewatch || 628 || align=right | 2.6 km || 
|-id=700 bgcolor=#d6d6d6
| 299700 ||  || — || August 18, 2006 || Kitt Peak || Spacewatch || — || align=right | 3.6 km || 
|}

299701–299800 

|-bgcolor=#d6d6d6
| 299701 ||  || — || August 19, 2006 || Kitt Peak || Spacewatch || KOR || align=right | 1.6 km || 
|-id=702 bgcolor=#E9E9E9
| 299702 ||  || — || August 19, 2006 || Kitt Peak || Spacewatch || AGN || align=right | 1.3 km || 
|-id=703 bgcolor=#E9E9E9
| 299703 ||  || — || August 19, 2006 || Kitt Peak || Spacewatch || HOF || align=right | 3.4 km || 
|-id=704 bgcolor=#d6d6d6
| 299704 ||  || — || August 19, 2006 || Kitt Peak || Spacewatch || — || align=right | 2.2 km || 
|-id=705 bgcolor=#E9E9E9
| 299705 ||  || — || August 19, 2006 || Kitt Peak || Spacewatch || — || align=right | 2.9 km || 
|-id=706 bgcolor=#E9E9E9
| 299706 ||  || — || August 27, 2006 || Kitt Peak || Spacewatch || — || align=right | 2.3 km || 
|-id=707 bgcolor=#d6d6d6
| 299707 ||  || — || August 29, 2006 || Anderson Mesa || LONEOS || BRA || align=right | 1.8 km || 
|-id=708 bgcolor=#E9E9E9
| 299708 ||  || — || August 29, 2006 || Catalina || CSS || — || align=right | 2.7 km || 
|-id=709 bgcolor=#d6d6d6
| 299709 ||  || — || August 29, 2006 || Catalina || CSS || — || align=right | 4.0 km || 
|-id=710 bgcolor=#d6d6d6
| 299710 ||  || — || August 28, 2006 || Anderson Mesa || LONEOS || — || align=right | 2.6 km || 
|-id=711 bgcolor=#d6d6d6
| 299711 ||  || — || August 18, 2006 || Kitt Peak || Spacewatch || Tj (2.93) || align=right | 3.4 km || 
|-id=712 bgcolor=#E9E9E9
| 299712 ||  || — || August 18, 2006 || Kitt Peak || Spacewatch || — || align=right | 3.0 km || 
|-id=713 bgcolor=#d6d6d6
| 299713 ||  || — || August 29, 2006 || Anderson Mesa || LONEOS || — || align=right | 4.5 km || 
|-id=714 bgcolor=#d6d6d6
| 299714 ||  || — || August 19, 2006 || Kitt Peak || Spacewatch || — || align=right | 2.5 km || 
|-id=715 bgcolor=#d6d6d6
| 299715 ||  || — || August 21, 2006 || Kitt Peak || Spacewatch || — || align=right | 4.4 km || 
|-id=716 bgcolor=#d6d6d6
| 299716 ||  || — || September 14, 2006 || Catalina || CSS || — || align=right | 3.4 km || 
|-id=717 bgcolor=#d6d6d6
| 299717 ||  || — || September 14, 2006 || Kitt Peak || Spacewatch || EOS || align=right | 2.3 km || 
|-id=718 bgcolor=#E9E9E9
| 299718 ||  || — || September 14, 2006 || Catalina || CSS || — || align=right | 2.7 km || 
|-id=719 bgcolor=#d6d6d6
| 299719 ||  || — || September 14, 2006 || Catalina || CSS || EOS || align=right | 2.6 km || 
|-id=720 bgcolor=#d6d6d6
| 299720 ||  || — || September 14, 2006 || Palomar || NEAT || — || align=right | 3.1 km || 
|-id=721 bgcolor=#d6d6d6
| 299721 ||  || — || September 15, 2006 || Kitt Peak || Spacewatch || — || align=right | 2.3 km || 
|-id=722 bgcolor=#d6d6d6
| 299722 ||  || — || September 14, 2006 || Kitt Peak || Spacewatch || — || align=right | 2.5 km || 
|-id=723 bgcolor=#d6d6d6
| 299723 ||  || — || September 14, 2006 || Catalina || CSS || — || align=right | 3.3 km || 
|-id=724 bgcolor=#d6d6d6
| 299724 ||  || — || September 12, 2006 || Catalina || CSS || KOR || align=right | 1.7 km || 
|-id=725 bgcolor=#d6d6d6
| 299725 ||  || — || September 12, 2006 || Catalina || CSS || — || align=right | 3.4 km || 
|-id=726 bgcolor=#d6d6d6
| 299726 ||  || — || September 14, 2006 || Catalina || CSS || — || align=right | 2.9 km || 
|-id=727 bgcolor=#d6d6d6
| 299727 ||  || — || September 14, 2006 || Kitt Peak || Spacewatch || KOR || align=right | 1.3 km || 
|-id=728 bgcolor=#d6d6d6
| 299728 ||  || — || September 14, 2006 || Kitt Peak || Spacewatch || — || align=right | 5.1 km || 
|-id=729 bgcolor=#d6d6d6
| 299729 ||  || — || September 14, 2006 || Kitt Peak || Spacewatch || HYG || align=right | 3.6 km || 
|-id=730 bgcolor=#d6d6d6
| 299730 ||  || — || September 14, 2006 || Kitt Peak || Spacewatch || EOS || align=right | 1.9 km || 
|-id=731 bgcolor=#d6d6d6
| 299731 ||  || — || September 14, 2006 || Kitt Peak || Spacewatch || LIX || align=right | 5.6 km || 
|-id=732 bgcolor=#d6d6d6
| 299732 ||  || — || September 14, 2006 || Kitt Peak || Spacewatch || — || align=right | 2.6 km || 
|-id=733 bgcolor=#d6d6d6
| 299733 ||  || — || September 14, 2006 || Kitt Peak || Spacewatch || KOR || align=right | 1.3 km || 
|-id=734 bgcolor=#d6d6d6
| 299734 ||  || — || September 15, 2006 || Kitt Peak || Spacewatch || — || align=right | 2.7 km || 
|-id=735 bgcolor=#d6d6d6
| 299735 ||  || — || September 15, 2006 || Kitt Peak || Spacewatch || — || align=right | 3.4 km || 
|-id=736 bgcolor=#d6d6d6
| 299736 ||  || — || September 14, 2006 || Catalina || CSS || — || align=right | 4.8 km || 
|-id=737 bgcolor=#E9E9E9
| 299737 ||  || — || September 15, 2006 || Kitt Peak || Spacewatch || — || align=right | 3.0 km || 
|-id=738 bgcolor=#d6d6d6
| 299738 ||  || — || September 15, 2006 || Kitt Peak || Spacewatch || — || align=right | 2.5 km || 
|-id=739 bgcolor=#d6d6d6
| 299739 ||  || — || September 15, 2006 || Kitt Peak || Spacewatch || — || align=right | 2.1 km || 
|-id=740 bgcolor=#d6d6d6
| 299740 ||  || — || September 15, 2006 || Kitt Peak || Spacewatch || KOR || align=right | 1.3 km || 
|-id=741 bgcolor=#d6d6d6
| 299741 ||  || — || September 15, 2006 || Kitt Peak || Spacewatch || — || align=right | 2.6 km || 
|-id=742 bgcolor=#d6d6d6
| 299742 ||  || — || September 15, 2006 || Kitt Peak || Spacewatch || KOR || align=right | 1.6 km || 
|-id=743 bgcolor=#d6d6d6
| 299743 ||  || — || September 15, 2006 || Kitt Peak || Spacewatch || — || align=right | 3.5 km || 
|-id=744 bgcolor=#d6d6d6
| 299744 ||  || — || September 15, 2006 || Kitt Peak || Spacewatch || — || align=right | 2.3 km || 
|-id=745 bgcolor=#d6d6d6
| 299745 ||  || — || September 15, 2006 || Kitt Peak || Spacewatch || — || align=right | 2.5 km || 
|-id=746 bgcolor=#d6d6d6
| 299746 ||  || — || September 15, 2006 || Kitt Peak || Spacewatch || — || align=right | 2.6 km || 
|-id=747 bgcolor=#d6d6d6
| 299747 ||  || — || September 15, 2006 || Kitt Peak || Spacewatch || — || align=right | 3.2 km || 
|-id=748 bgcolor=#d6d6d6
| 299748 ||  || — || September 15, 2006 || Kitt Peak || Spacewatch || — || align=right | 3.6 km || 
|-id=749 bgcolor=#d6d6d6
| 299749 ||  || — || September 15, 2006 || Kitt Peak || Spacewatch || — || align=right | 3.9 km || 
|-id=750 bgcolor=#d6d6d6
| 299750 ||  || — || September 15, 2006 || Kitt Peak || Spacewatch || — || align=right | 2.4 km || 
|-id=751 bgcolor=#d6d6d6
| 299751 ||  || — || September 15, 2006 || Kitt Peak || Spacewatch || KAR || align=right | 1.2 km || 
|-id=752 bgcolor=#E9E9E9
| 299752 ||  || — || September 14, 2006 || Catalina || CSS || — || align=right | 3.0 km || 
|-id=753 bgcolor=#E9E9E9
| 299753 ||  || — || September 14, 2006 || Catalina || CSS || GEF || align=right | 1.6 km || 
|-id=754 bgcolor=#d6d6d6
| 299754 ||  || — || September 14, 2006 || Kitt Peak || Spacewatch || THM || align=right | 2.3 km || 
|-id=755 bgcolor=#d6d6d6
| 299755 Ericmontellese ||  ||  || September 14, 2006 || Mauna Kea || J. Masiero || — || align=right | 2.2 km || 
|-id=756 bgcolor=#d6d6d6
| 299756 Kerryaileen ||  ||  || September 14, 2006 || Mauna Kea || J. Masiero || THM || align=right | 2.4 km || 
|-id=757 bgcolor=#d6d6d6
| 299757 ||  || — || September 15, 2006 || Kitt Peak || Spacewatch || — || align=right | 2.5 km || 
|-id=758 bgcolor=#d6d6d6
| 299758 ||  || — || September 15, 2006 || Kitt Peak || Spacewatch || KOR || align=right | 1.4 km || 
|-id=759 bgcolor=#d6d6d6
| 299759 ||  || — || September 15, 2006 || Kitt Peak || Spacewatch || 628 || align=right | 2.4 km || 
|-id=760 bgcolor=#d6d6d6
| 299760 ||  || — || September 16, 2006 || Catalina || CSS || — || align=right | 5.1 km || 
|-id=761 bgcolor=#E9E9E9
| 299761 ||  || — || September 16, 2006 || Palomar || NEAT || HOF || align=right | 3.7 km || 
|-id=762 bgcolor=#d6d6d6
| 299762 ||  || — || September 16, 2006 || Catalina || CSS || ALA || align=right | 7.7 km || 
|-id=763 bgcolor=#d6d6d6
| 299763 ||  || — || September 16, 2006 || Catalina || CSS || IMH || align=right | 5.1 km || 
|-id=764 bgcolor=#d6d6d6
| 299764 ||  || — || September 17, 2006 || Kitt Peak || Spacewatch || — || align=right | 2.8 km || 
|-id=765 bgcolor=#d6d6d6
| 299765 ||  || — || September 17, 2006 || Catalina || CSS || — || align=right | 4.6 km || 
|-id=766 bgcolor=#d6d6d6
| 299766 ||  || — || September 16, 2006 || Anderson Mesa || LONEOS || CHA || align=right | 2.6 km || 
|-id=767 bgcolor=#d6d6d6
| 299767 ||  || — || September 16, 2006 || Anderson Mesa || LONEOS || KOR || align=right | 1.8 km || 
|-id=768 bgcolor=#d6d6d6
| 299768 ||  || — || September 16, 2006 || Catalina || CSS || EOS || align=right | 3.3 km || 
|-id=769 bgcolor=#E9E9E9
| 299769 ||  || — || September 17, 2006 || Kitt Peak || Spacewatch || WIT || align=right | 1.1 km || 
|-id=770 bgcolor=#d6d6d6
| 299770 ||  || — || September 17, 2006 || Kitt Peak || Spacewatch || — || align=right | 2.3 km || 
|-id=771 bgcolor=#d6d6d6
| 299771 ||  || — || September 17, 2006 || Kitt Peak || Spacewatch || — || align=right | 3.4 km || 
|-id=772 bgcolor=#d6d6d6
| 299772 ||  || — || September 18, 2006 || Kitt Peak || Spacewatch || — || align=right | 2.7 km || 
|-id=773 bgcolor=#d6d6d6
| 299773 ||  || — || September 18, 2006 || Catalina || CSS || — || align=right | 3.6 km || 
|-id=774 bgcolor=#d6d6d6
| 299774 ||  || — || September 18, 2006 || Catalina || CSS || KOR || align=right | 1.6 km || 
|-id=775 bgcolor=#E9E9E9
| 299775 ||  || — || September 18, 2006 || Catalina || CSS || GEF || align=right | 1.8 km || 
|-id=776 bgcolor=#d6d6d6
| 299776 ||  || — || September 18, 2006 || Catalina || CSS || — || align=right | 4.9 km || 
|-id=777 bgcolor=#d6d6d6
| 299777 Tanyastreeter ||  ||  || September 21, 2006 || Vallemare di Borbona || V. S. Casulli || KOR || align=right | 1.3 km || 
|-id=778 bgcolor=#E9E9E9
| 299778 ||  || — || September 19, 2006 || Catalina || CSS || — || align=right | 2.6 km || 
|-id=779 bgcolor=#E9E9E9
| 299779 ||  || — || September 18, 2006 || Kitt Peak || Spacewatch || — || align=right | 2.0 km || 
|-id=780 bgcolor=#d6d6d6
| 299780 ||  || — || September 19, 2006 || Kitt Peak || Spacewatch || — || align=right | 2.8 km || 
|-id=781 bgcolor=#d6d6d6
| 299781 ||  || — || September 19, 2006 || Kitt Peak || Spacewatch || EOS || align=right | 4.2 km || 
|-id=782 bgcolor=#d6d6d6
| 299782 ||  || — || September 19, 2006 || Kitt Peak || Spacewatch || — || align=right | 3.0 km || 
|-id=783 bgcolor=#d6d6d6
| 299783 ||  || — || September 19, 2006 || Kitt Peak || Spacewatch || EOS || align=right | 1.9 km || 
|-id=784 bgcolor=#d6d6d6
| 299784 ||  || — || September 19, 2006 || Kitt Peak || Spacewatch || — || align=right | 2.3 km || 
|-id=785 bgcolor=#d6d6d6
| 299785 Alexeymolchanov ||  ||  || September 22, 2006 || Vallemare Borbon || V. S. Casulli || — || align=right | 2.8 km || 
|-id=786 bgcolor=#d6d6d6
| 299786 ||  || — || September 18, 2006 || Kitt Peak || Spacewatch || — || align=right | 1.7 km || 
|-id=787 bgcolor=#d6d6d6
| 299787 ||  || — || September 18, 2006 || Kitt Peak || Spacewatch || — || align=right | 2.6 km || 
|-id=788 bgcolor=#d6d6d6
| 299788 ||  || — || September 18, 2006 || Kitt Peak || Spacewatch || EOS || align=right | 1.9 km || 
|-id=789 bgcolor=#d6d6d6
| 299789 ||  || — || September 18, 2006 || Kitt Peak || Spacewatch || URS || align=right | 2.8 km || 
|-id=790 bgcolor=#d6d6d6
| 299790 ||  || — || September 18, 2006 || Kitt Peak || Spacewatch || EMA || align=right | 3.4 km || 
|-id=791 bgcolor=#d6d6d6
| 299791 ||  || — || September 18, 2006 || Kitt Peak || Spacewatch || — || align=right | 3.0 km || 
|-id=792 bgcolor=#d6d6d6
| 299792 ||  || — || September 18, 2006 || Kitt Peak || Spacewatch || — || align=right | 2.9 km || 
|-id=793 bgcolor=#d6d6d6
| 299793 ||  || — || September 18, 2006 || Kitt Peak || Spacewatch || KOR || align=right | 1.5 km || 
|-id=794 bgcolor=#d6d6d6
| 299794 ||  || — || September 18, 2006 || Kitt Peak || Spacewatch || — || align=right | 2.9 km || 
|-id=795 bgcolor=#d6d6d6
| 299795 ||  || — || September 18, 2006 || Kitt Peak || Spacewatch || — || align=right | 2.7 km || 
|-id=796 bgcolor=#d6d6d6
| 299796 ||  || — || September 18, 2006 || Kitt Peak || Spacewatch || — || align=right | 2.0 km || 
|-id=797 bgcolor=#d6d6d6
| 299797 ||  || — || September 18, 2006 || Kitt Peak || Spacewatch || — || align=right | 3.5 km || 
|-id=798 bgcolor=#d6d6d6
| 299798 ||  || — || September 18, 2006 || Kitt Peak || Spacewatch || — || align=right | 2.6 km || 
|-id=799 bgcolor=#d6d6d6
| 299799 ||  || — || September 20, 2001 || Socorro || LINEAR || 628 || align=right | 2.0 km || 
|-id=800 bgcolor=#d6d6d6
| 299800 ||  || — || September 19, 2006 || Kitt Peak || Spacewatch || — || align=right | 3.7 km || 
|}

299801–299900 

|-bgcolor=#E9E9E9
| 299801 ||  || — || September 19, 2006 || Anderson Mesa || LONEOS || — || align=right | 2.9 km || 
|-id=802 bgcolor=#d6d6d6
| 299802 ||  || — || September 19, 2006 || Kitt Peak || Spacewatch || — || align=right | 2.5 km || 
|-id=803 bgcolor=#d6d6d6
| 299803 ||  || — || September 19, 2006 || Kitt Peak || Spacewatch || — || align=right | 2.9 km || 
|-id=804 bgcolor=#E9E9E9
| 299804 ||  || — || September 23, 2006 || Kitt Peak || Spacewatch || WIT || align=right | 1.6 km || 
|-id=805 bgcolor=#d6d6d6
| 299805 ||  || — || September 24, 2006 || Kitt Peak || Spacewatch || — || align=right | 5.1 km || 
|-id=806 bgcolor=#d6d6d6
| 299806 ||  || — || September 18, 2006 || Catalina || CSS || — || align=right | 3.2 km || 
|-id=807 bgcolor=#d6d6d6
| 299807 ||  || — || September 18, 2006 || Catalina || CSS || — || align=right | 3.6 km || 
|-id=808 bgcolor=#d6d6d6
| 299808 ||  || — || September 18, 2006 || Catalina || CSS || — || align=right | 2.4 km || 
|-id=809 bgcolor=#d6d6d6
| 299809 ||  || — || September 20, 2006 || Catalina || CSS || — || align=right | 4.1 km || 
|-id=810 bgcolor=#d6d6d6
| 299810 ||  || — || September 17, 2006 || Kitt Peak || Spacewatch || — || align=right | 3.9 km || 
|-id=811 bgcolor=#d6d6d6
| 299811 ||  || — || September 18, 2006 || Kitt Peak || Spacewatch || EOS || align=right | 2.7 km || 
|-id=812 bgcolor=#d6d6d6
| 299812 ||  || — || September 16, 2006 || Catalina || CSS || — || align=right | 4.1 km || 
|-id=813 bgcolor=#d6d6d6
| 299813 ||  || — || September 16, 2006 || Catalina || CSS || TEL || align=right | 1.8 km || 
|-id=814 bgcolor=#d6d6d6
| 299814 ||  || — || September 18, 2006 || Catalina || CSS || — || align=right | 3.7 km || 
|-id=815 bgcolor=#d6d6d6
| 299815 ||  || — || September 19, 2006 || Kitt Peak || Spacewatch || MRC || align=right | 3.2 km || 
|-id=816 bgcolor=#d6d6d6
| 299816 ||  || — || September 19, 2006 || Kitt Peak || Spacewatch || — || align=right | 2.5 km || 
|-id=817 bgcolor=#d6d6d6
| 299817 ||  || — || September 21, 2006 || Anderson Mesa || LONEOS || — || align=right | 4.1 km || 
|-id=818 bgcolor=#d6d6d6
| 299818 ||  || — || September 23, 2006 || Kitt Peak || Spacewatch || KOR || align=right | 1.6 km || 
|-id=819 bgcolor=#d6d6d6
| 299819 ||  || — || September 23, 2001 || Kitt Peak || Spacewatch || — || align=right | 2.4 km || 
|-id=820 bgcolor=#d6d6d6
| 299820 ||  || — || September 23, 2006 || Kitt Peak || Spacewatch || — || align=right | 2.6 km || 
|-id=821 bgcolor=#d6d6d6
| 299821 ||  || — || September 23, 2006 || Kitt Peak || Spacewatch || — || align=right | 3.0 km || 
|-id=822 bgcolor=#d6d6d6
| 299822 ||  || — || September 23, 2006 || Kitt Peak || Spacewatch || CHA || align=right | 2.2 km || 
|-id=823 bgcolor=#d6d6d6
| 299823 ||  || — || September 23, 2006 || Kitt Peak || Spacewatch || — || align=right | 2.7 km || 
|-id=824 bgcolor=#d6d6d6
| 299824 ||  || — || September 24, 2006 || Kitt Peak || Spacewatch || URS || align=right | 3.3 km || 
|-id=825 bgcolor=#d6d6d6
| 299825 ||  || — || September 25, 2006 || Kitt Peak || Spacewatch || LAU || align=right data-sort-value="0.90" | 900 m || 
|-id=826 bgcolor=#d6d6d6
| 299826 ||  || — || September 25, 2006 || Kitt Peak || Spacewatch || HYG || align=right | 4.1 km || 
|-id=827 bgcolor=#d6d6d6
| 299827 ||  || — || September 25, 2006 || Kitt Peak || Spacewatch || — || align=right | 3.3 km || 
|-id=828 bgcolor=#d6d6d6
| 299828 ||  || — || September 25, 2006 || Kitt Peak || Spacewatch || BRA || align=right | 2.3 km || 
|-id=829 bgcolor=#E9E9E9
| 299829 ||  || — || September 25, 2006 || Mount Lemmon || Mount Lemmon Survey || — || align=right | 3.0 km || 
|-id=830 bgcolor=#d6d6d6
| 299830 ||  || — || September 25, 2006 || Kitt Peak || Spacewatch || — || align=right | 2.4 km || 
|-id=831 bgcolor=#d6d6d6
| 299831 ||  || — || September 25, 2006 || Mount Lemmon || Mount Lemmon Survey || — || align=right | 2.1 km || 
|-id=832 bgcolor=#d6d6d6
| 299832 ||  || — || September 26, 2006 || Kitt Peak || Spacewatch || — || align=right | 3.5 km || 
|-id=833 bgcolor=#d6d6d6
| 299833 ||  || — || September 26, 2006 || Mount Lemmon || Mount Lemmon Survey || — || align=right | 2.5 km || 
|-id=834 bgcolor=#d6d6d6
| 299834 ||  || — || September 26, 2006 || Kitt Peak || Spacewatch || MEL || align=right | 4.8 km || 
|-id=835 bgcolor=#d6d6d6
| 299835 ||  || — || September 26, 2006 || Mount Lemmon || Mount Lemmon Survey || — || align=right | 2.6 km || 
|-id=836 bgcolor=#d6d6d6
| 299836 ||  || — || September 26, 2006 || Mount Lemmon || Mount Lemmon Survey || — || align=right | 2.7 km || 
|-id=837 bgcolor=#d6d6d6
| 299837 ||  || — || September 24, 2006 || Kitt Peak || Spacewatch || — || align=right | 2.3 km || 
|-id=838 bgcolor=#d6d6d6
| 299838 ||  || — || September 24, 2006 || Kitt Peak || Spacewatch || — || align=right | 2.8 km || 
|-id=839 bgcolor=#d6d6d6
| 299839 ||  || — || September 24, 2006 || Kitt Peak || Spacewatch || — || align=right | 2.6 km || 
|-id=840 bgcolor=#d6d6d6
| 299840 ||  || — || September 25, 2006 || Mount Lemmon || Mount Lemmon Survey || — || align=right | 2.6 km || 
|-id=841 bgcolor=#d6d6d6
| 299841 ||  || — || September 25, 2006 || Kitt Peak || Spacewatch || — || align=right | 2.5 km || 
|-id=842 bgcolor=#d6d6d6
| 299842 ||  || — || September 25, 2006 || Kitt Peak || Spacewatch || TEL || align=right | 1.7 km || 
|-id=843 bgcolor=#d6d6d6
| 299843 ||  || — || September 27, 2006 || Kitt Peak || Spacewatch || — || align=right | 3.1 km || 
|-id=844 bgcolor=#d6d6d6
| 299844 ||  || — || September 25, 2006 || Mount Lemmon || Mount Lemmon Survey || KOR || align=right | 1.8 km || 
|-id=845 bgcolor=#d6d6d6
| 299845 ||  || — || September 25, 2006 || Mount Lemmon || Mount Lemmon Survey || KOR || align=right | 1.7 km || 
|-id=846 bgcolor=#d6d6d6
| 299846 ||  || — || September 26, 2006 || Kitt Peak || Spacewatch || EOS || align=right | 2.1 km || 
|-id=847 bgcolor=#d6d6d6
| 299847 ||  || — || September 26, 2006 || Kitt Peak || Spacewatch || — || align=right | 2.9 km || 
|-id=848 bgcolor=#d6d6d6
| 299848 ||  || — || September 26, 2006 || Kitt Peak || Spacewatch || KOR || align=right | 1.6 km || 
|-id=849 bgcolor=#d6d6d6
| 299849 ||  || — || September 26, 2006 || Kitt Peak || Spacewatch || — || align=right | 3.1 km || 
|-id=850 bgcolor=#d6d6d6
| 299850 ||  || — || September 26, 2006 || Kitt Peak || Spacewatch || — || align=right | 3.0 km || 
|-id=851 bgcolor=#d6d6d6
| 299851 ||  || — || September 26, 2006 || Kitt Peak || Spacewatch || — || align=right | 2.4 km || 
|-id=852 bgcolor=#d6d6d6
| 299852 ||  || — || September 26, 2006 || Mount Lemmon || Mount Lemmon Survey || KOR || align=right | 1.4 km || 
|-id=853 bgcolor=#d6d6d6
| 299853 ||  || — || September 26, 2006 || Kitt Peak || Spacewatch || KOR || align=right | 1.7 km || 
|-id=854 bgcolor=#d6d6d6
| 299854 ||  || — || September 26, 2006 || Kitt Peak || Spacewatch || — || align=right | 4.0 km || 
|-id=855 bgcolor=#d6d6d6
| 299855 ||  || — || September 26, 2006 || Kitt Peak || Spacewatch || KAR || align=right | 1.2 km || 
|-id=856 bgcolor=#d6d6d6
| 299856 ||  || — || September 26, 2006 || Mount Lemmon || Mount Lemmon Survey || — || align=right | 2.7 km || 
|-id=857 bgcolor=#d6d6d6
| 299857 ||  || — || September 26, 2006 || Mount Lemmon || Mount Lemmon Survey || — || align=right | 3.4 km || 
|-id=858 bgcolor=#d6d6d6
| 299858 ||  || — || September 26, 2006 || Mount Lemmon || Mount Lemmon Survey || — || align=right | 3.5 km || 
|-id=859 bgcolor=#d6d6d6
| 299859 ||  || — || September 26, 2006 || Mount Lemmon || Mount Lemmon Survey || EMA || align=right | 3.9 km || 
|-id=860 bgcolor=#d6d6d6
| 299860 ||  || — || September 26, 2006 || Kitt Peak || Spacewatch || HYG || align=right | 3.6 km || 
|-id=861 bgcolor=#d6d6d6
| 299861 ||  || — || September 26, 2006 || Kitt Peak || Spacewatch || — || align=right | 3.4 km || 
|-id=862 bgcolor=#d6d6d6
| 299862 ||  || — || September 26, 2006 || Kitt Peak || Spacewatch || — || align=right | 2.3 km || 
|-id=863 bgcolor=#d6d6d6
| 299863 ||  || — || September 27, 2006 || Mount Lemmon || Mount Lemmon Survey || EOS || align=right | 2.6 km || 
|-id=864 bgcolor=#d6d6d6
| 299864 ||  || — || September 27, 2006 || Mount Lemmon || Mount Lemmon Survey || VER || align=right | 2.9 km || 
|-id=865 bgcolor=#d6d6d6
| 299865 ||  || — || September 27, 2006 || Mount Lemmon || Mount Lemmon Survey || — || align=right | 2.7 km || 
|-id=866 bgcolor=#d6d6d6
| 299866 ||  || — || September 27, 2006 || Kitt Peak || Spacewatch || — || align=right | 3.3 km || 
|-id=867 bgcolor=#d6d6d6
| 299867 ||  || — || September 25, 2006 || Anderson Mesa || LONEOS || — || align=right | 2.9 km || 
|-id=868 bgcolor=#d6d6d6
| 299868 ||  || — || September 26, 2006 || Catalina || CSS || — || align=right | 3.7 km || 
|-id=869 bgcolor=#d6d6d6
| 299869 ||  || — || September 27, 2006 || Catalina || CSS || — || align=right | 5.2 km || 
|-id=870 bgcolor=#d6d6d6
| 299870 ||  || — || September 25, 2006 || Kitt Peak || Spacewatch || — || align=right | 3.1 km || 
|-id=871 bgcolor=#d6d6d6
| 299871 ||  || — || September 25, 2006 || Kitt Peak || Spacewatch || — || align=right | 3.6 km || 
|-id=872 bgcolor=#d6d6d6
| 299872 ||  || — || September 25, 2006 || Kitt Peak || Spacewatch || — || align=right | 3.0 km || 
|-id=873 bgcolor=#d6d6d6
| 299873 ||  || — || September 25, 2006 || Mount Lemmon || Mount Lemmon Survey || — || align=right | 2.9 km || 
|-id=874 bgcolor=#d6d6d6
| 299874 ||  || — || September 25, 2006 || Anderson Mesa || LONEOS || — || align=right | 3.1 km || 
|-id=875 bgcolor=#d6d6d6
| 299875 ||  || — || September 25, 2006 || Anderson Mesa || LONEOS || — || align=right | 3.7 km || 
|-id=876 bgcolor=#d6d6d6
| 299876 ||  || — || September 27, 2006 || Kitt Peak || Spacewatch || LAU || align=right data-sort-value="0.96" | 960 m || 
|-id=877 bgcolor=#d6d6d6
| 299877 ||  || — || September 27, 2006 || Mount Lemmon || Mount Lemmon Survey || — || align=right | 2.6 km || 
|-id=878 bgcolor=#d6d6d6
| 299878 ||  || — || September 27, 2006 || Mount Lemmon || Mount Lemmon Survey || — || align=right | 3.1 km || 
|-id=879 bgcolor=#d6d6d6
| 299879 ||  || — || September 27, 2006 || Kitt Peak || Spacewatch || — || align=right | 2.5 km || 
|-id=880 bgcolor=#d6d6d6
| 299880 ||  || — || September 27, 2006 || Kitt Peak || Spacewatch || — || align=right | 3.0 km || 
|-id=881 bgcolor=#d6d6d6
| 299881 ||  || — || September 27, 2006 || Kitt Peak || Spacewatch || — || align=right | 2.7 km || 
|-id=882 bgcolor=#d6d6d6
| 299882 ||  || — || September 27, 2006 || Kitt Peak || Spacewatch || — || align=right | 3.7 km || 
|-id=883 bgcolor=#d6d6d6
| 299883 ||  || — || September 28, 2006 || Mount Lemmon || Mount Lemmon Survey || — || align=right | 2.8 km || 
|-id=884 bgcolor=#d6d6d6
| 299884 ||  || — || September 28, 2006 || Mount Lemmon || Mount Lemmon Survey || — || align=right | 3.9 km || 
|-id=885 bgcolor=#d6d6d6
| 299885 ||  || — || September 28, 2006 || Kitt Peak || Spacewatch || — || align=right | 3.4 km || 
|-id=886 bgcolor=#d6d6d6
| 299886 ||  || — || September 28, 2006 || Kitt Peak || Spacewatch || KOR || align=right | 1.7 km || 
|-id=887 bgcolor=#d6d6d6
| 299887 ||  || — || September 28, 2006 || Kitt Peak || Spacewatch || — || align=right | 3.2 km || 
|-id=888 bgcolor=#d6d6d6
| 299888 ||  || — || September 28, 2006 || Kitt Peak || Spacewatch || — || align=right | 3.1 km || 
|-id=889 bgcolor=#d6d6d6
| 299889 ||  || — || September 28, 2006 || Kitt Peak || Spacewatch || — || align=right | 3.6 km || 
|-id=890 bgcolor=#d6d6d6
| 299890 ||  || — || September 28, 2006 || Kitt Peak || Spacewatch || EOS || align=right | 2.0 km || 
|-id=891 bgcolor=#d6d6d6
| 299891 ||  || — || September 28, 2006 || Kitt Peak || Spacewatch || — || align=right | 2.9 km || 
|-id=892 bgcolor=#d6d6d6
| 299892 ||  || — || September 28, 2006 || Kitt Peak || Spacewatch || — || align=right | 3.2 km || 
|-id=893 bgcolor=#d6d6d6
| 299893 ||  || — || September 28, 2006 || Kitt Peak || Spacewatch || — || align=right | 2.8 km || 
|-id=894 bgcolor=#d6d6d6
| 299894 ||  || — || September 30, 2006 || Catalina || CSS || CHA || align=right | 3.0 km || 
|-id=895 bgcolor=#d6d6d6
| 299895 ||  || — || September 30, 2006 || Catalina || CSS || — || align=right | 3.2 km || 
|-id=896 bgcolor=#d6d6d6
| 299896 ||  || — || September 30, 2006 || Mount Lemmon || Mount Lemmon Survey || EOS || align=right | 1.8 km || 
|-id=897 bgcolor=#d6d6d6
| 299897 Skipitis ||  ||  || September 23, 2006 || Moletai || Molėtai Obs. || HYG || align=right | 3.2 km || 
|-id=898 bgcolor=#d6d6d6
| 299898 ||  || — || September 28, 2006 || Mount Lemmon || Mount Lemmon Survey || — || align=right | 3.2 km || 
|-id=899 bgcolor=#d6d6d6
| 299899 ||  || — || September 16, 2006 || Apache Point || A. C. Becker || — || align=right | 2.7 km || 
|-id=900 bgcolor=#d6d6d6
| 299900 ||  || — || September 16, 2006 || Apache Point || A. C. Becker || — || align=right | 3.2 km || 
|}

299901–300000 

|-bgcolor=#d6d6d6
| 299901 ||  || — || September 16, 2006 || Apache Point || A. C. Becker || — || align=right | 3.1 km || 
|-id=902 bgcolor=#d6d6d6
| 299902 ||  || — || September 16, 2006 || Apache Point || A. C. Becker || — || align=right | 2.9 km || 
|-id=903 bgcolor=#d6d6d6
| 299903 ||  || — || September 17, 2006 || Apache Point || A. C. Becker || KOR || align=right | 1.9 km || 
|-id=904 bgcolor=#d6d6d6
| 299904 ||  || — || September 17, 2006 || Apache Point || A. C. Becker || EOS || align=right | 2.8 km || 
|-id=905 bgcolor=#d6d6d6
| 299905 ||  || — || September 27, 2006 || Apache Point || A. C. Becker || URS || align=right | 4.7 km || 
|-id=906 bgcolor=#d6d6d6
| 299906 ||  || — || September 27, 2006 || Apache Point || A. C. Becker || — || align=right | 3.6 km || 
|-id=907 bgcolor=#d6d6d6
| 299907 ||  || — || September 28, 2006 || Apache Point || A. C. Becker || — || align=right | 2.9 km || 
|-id=908 bgcolor=#d6d6d6
| 299908 ||  || — || September 17, 2006 || Kitt Peak || Spacewatch || KOR || align=right | 1.3 km || 
|-id=909 bgcolor=#d6d6d6
| 299909 ||  || — || September 19, 2006 || Anderson Mesa || LONEOS || — || align=right | 3.7 km || 
|-id=910 bgcolor=#d6d6d6
| 299910 ||  || — || September 30, 2006 || Kitt Peak || Spacewatch || — || align=right | 4.2 km || 
|-id=911 bgcolor=#d6d6d6
| 299911 ||  || — || September 26, 2006 || Kitt Peak || Spacewatch || — || align=right | 5.0 km || 
|-id=912 bgcolor=#d6d6d6
| 299912 ||  || — || September 16, 2006 || Kitt Peak || Spacewatch || CHA || align=right | 2.3 km || 
|-id=913 bgcolor=#d6d6d6
| 299913 ||  || — || September 26, 2006 || Kitt Peak || Spacewatch || — || align=right | 4.1 km || 
|-id=914 bgcolor=#d6d6d6
| 299914 ||  || — || September 30, 2006 || Mount Lemmon || Mount Lemmon Survey || HYG || align=right | 3.2 km || 
|-id=915 bgcolor=#d6d6d6
| 299915 ||  || — || September 28, 2006 || Mount Lemmon || Mount Lemmon Survey || — || align=right | 2.9 km || 
|-id=916 bgcolor=#E9E9E9
| 299916 ||  || — || September 20, 2006 || Kitt Peak || Spacewatch || — || align=right | 2.8 km || 
|-id=917 bgcolor=#d6d6d6
| 299917 ||  || — || September 24, 2006 || Kitt Peak || Spacewatch || EOS || align=right | 1.7 km || 
|-id=918 bgcolor=#d6d6d6
| 299918 ||  || — || September 17, 2006 || Kitt Peak || Spacewatch || — || align=right | 2.6 km || 
|-id=919 bgcolor=#d6d6d6
| 299919 || 2006 TZ || — || October 3, 2006 || Great Shefford || P. Birtwhistle || EOS || align=right | 2.6 km || 
|-id=920 bgcolor=#d6d6d6
| 299920 ||  || — || October 2, 2006 || Kitt Peak || Spacewatch || KOR || align=right | 1.8 km || 
|-id=921 bgcolor=#d6d6d6
| 299921 ||  || — || October 2, 2006 || Mount Lemmon || Mount Lemmon Survey || BRA || align=right | 1.8 km || 
|-id=922 bgcolor=#d6d6d6
| 299922 ||  || — || October 4, 2006 || Great Shefford || P. Birtwhistle || EOS || align=right | 2.0 km || 
|-id=923 bgcolor=#d6d6d6
| 299923 ||  || — || October 4, 2006 || Mount Lemmon || Mount Lemmon Survey || — || align=right | 1.8 km || 
|-id=924 bgcolor=#d6d6d6
| 299924 ||  || — || October 11, 2006 || Kitt Peak || Spacewatch || THM || align=right | 2.4 km || 
|-id=925 bgcolor=#d6d6d6
| 299925 ||  || — || October 12, 2006 || Kitt Peak || Spacewatch || — || align=right | 3.1 km || 
|-id=926 bgcolor=#d6d6d6
| 299926 ||  || — || October 13, 2006 || Kitt Peak || Spacewatch || EOS || align=right | 2.8 km || 
|-id=927 bgcolor=#d6d6d6
| 299927 ||  || — || October 11, 2006 || Kitt Peak || Spacewatch || — || align=right | 3.3 km || 
|-id=928 bgcolor=#d6d6d6
| 299928 ||  || — || October 11, 2006 || Kitt Peak || Spacewatch || — || align=right | 3.7 km || 
|-id=929 bgcolor=#d6d6d6
| 299929 ||  || — || October 11, 2006 || Kitt Peak || Spacewatch || THM || align=right | 2.6 km || 
|-id=930 bgcolor=#d6d6d6
| 299930 ||  || — || October 11, 2006 || Kitt Peak || Spacewatch || — || align=right | 3.0 km || 
|-id=931 bgcolor=#d6d6d6
| 299931 ||  || — || October 12, 2006 || Kitt Peak || Spacewatch || — || align=right | 2.3 km || 
|-id=932 bgcolor=#d6d6d6
| 299932 ||  || — || October 12, 2006 || Kitt Peak || Spacewatch || — || align=right | 3.8 km || 
|-id=933 bgcolor=#d6d6d6
| 299933 ||  || — || October 12, 2006 || Kitt Peak || Spacewatch || — || align=right | 4.2 km || 
|-id=934 bgcolor=#d6d6d6
| 299934 ||  || — || October 12, 2006 || Kitt Peak || Spacewatch || HYG || align=right | 3.1 km || 
|-id=935 bgcolor=#d6d6d6
| 299935 ||  || — || October 12, 2006 || Kitt Peak || Spacewatch || THM || align=right | 2.5 km || 
|-id=936 bgcolor=#d6d6d6
| 299936 ||  || — || October 12, 2006 || Kitt Peak || Spacewatch || THM || align=right | 1.9 km || 
|-id=937 bgcolor=#d6d6d6
| 299937 ||  || — || October 12, 2006 || Kitt Peak || Spacewatch || — || align=right | 2.7 km || 
|-id=938 bgcolor=#d6d6d6
| 299938 ||  || — || October 12, 2006 || Kitt Peak || Spacewatch || THM || align=right | 2.3 km || 
|-id=939 bgcolor=#d6d6d6
| 299939 ||  || — || October 12, 2006 || Kitt Peak || Spacewatch || — || align=right | 2.7 km || 
|-id=940 bgcolor=#d6d6d6
| 299940 ||  || — || October 12, 2006 || Kitt Peak || Spacewatch || — || align=right | 3.7 km || 
|-id=941 bgcolor=#d6d6d6
| 299941 ||  || — || October 12, 2006 || Kitt Peak || Spacewatch || — || align=right | 3.0 km || 
|-id=942 bgcolor=#d6d6d6
| 299942 ||  || — || October 12, 2006 || Kitt Peak || Spacewatch || — || align=right | 4.9 km || 
|-id=943 bgcolor=#d6d6d6
| 299943 ||  || — || October 12, 2006 || Kitt Peak || Spacewatch || — || align=right | 3.4 km || 
|-id=944 bgcolor=#d6d6d6
| 299944 ||  || — || October 12, 2006 || Kitt Peak || Spacewatch || — || align=right | 4.3 km || 
|-id=945 bgcolor=#d6d6d6
| 299945 ||  || — || October 12, 2006 || Kitt Peak || Spacewatch || THM || align=right | 2.9 km || 
|-id=946 bgcolor=#d6d6d6
| 299946 ||  || — || October 12, 2006 || Palomar || NEAT || — || align=right | 4.5 km || 
|-id=947 bgcolor=#d6d6d6
| 299947 ||  || — || October 12, 2006 || Palomar || NEAT || — || align=right | 4.1 km || 
|-id=948 bgcolor=#d6d6d6
| 299948 ||  || — || October 14, 2006 || Eskridge || Farpoint Obs. || — || align=right | 4.4 km || 
|-id=949 bgcolor=#d6d6d6
| 299949 ||  || — || October 13, 2006 || Kitt Peak || Spacewatch || — || align=right | 3.6 km || 
|-id=950 bgcolor=#d6d6d6
| 299950 ||  || — || October 13, 2006 || Kitt Peak || Spacewatch || — || align=right | 4.1 km || 
|-id=951 bgcolor=#d6d6d6
| 299951 ||  || — || October 13, 2006 || Kitt Peak || Spacewatch || — || align=right | 3.6 km || 
|-id=952 bgcolor=#d6d6d6
| 299952 ||  || — || October 14, 2006 || Bergisch Gladbac || W. Bickel || — || align=right | 2.6 km || 
|-id=953 bgcolor=#d6d6d6
| 299953 ||  || — || October 10, 2006 || Palomar || NEAT || — || align=right | 4.7 km || 
|-id=954 bgcolor=#d6d6d6
| 299954 ||  || — || October 11, 2006 || Kitt Peak || Spacewatch || — || align=right | 3.4 km || 
|-id=955 bgcolor=#d6d6d6
| 299955 ||  || — || October 11, 2006 || Palomar || NEAT || — || align=right | 4.2 km || 
|-id=956 bgcolor=#d6d6d6
| 299956 ||  || — || October 11, 2006 || Palomar || NEAT || — || align=right | 3.6 km || 
|-id=957 bgcolor=#d6d6d6
| 299957 ||  || — || October 11, 2006 || Palomar || NEAT || EOS || align=right | 2.2 km || 
|-id=958 bgcolor=#d6d6d6
| 299958 ||  || — || October 11, 2006 || Palomar || NEAT || — || align=right | 5.4 km || 
|-id=959 bgcolor=#d6d6d6
| 299959 ||  || — || October 11, 2006 || Palomar || NEAT || — || align=right | 4.0 km || 
|-id=960 bgcolor=#d6d6d6
| 299960 ||  || — || October 12, 2006 || Palomar || NEAT || — || align=right | 3.2 km || 
|-id=961 bgcolor=#d6d6d6
| 299961 ||  || — || October 12, 2006 || Palomar || NEAT || EOS || align=right | 3.0 km || 
|-id=962 bgcolor=#d6d6d6
| 299962 ||  || — || October 12, 2006 || Palomar || NEAT || — || align=right | 3.9 km || 
|-id=963 bgcolor=#d6d6d6
| 299963 ||  || — || October 12, 2006 || Kitt Peak || Spacewatch || — || align=right | 4.3 km || 
|-id=964 bgcolor=#d6d6d6
| 299964 ||  || — || October 13, 2006 || Kitt Peak || Spacewatch || — || align=right | 3.5 km || 
|-id=965 bgcolor=#d6d6d6
| 299965 ||  || — || October 13, 2006 || Kitt Peak || Spacewatch || — || align=right | 3.9 km || 
|-id=966 bgcolor=#d6d6d6
| 299966 ||  || — || October 13, 2006 || Kitt Peak || Spacewatch || — || align=right | 4.1 km || 
|-id=967 bgcolor=#d6d6d6
| 299967 ||  || — || October 13, 2006 || Kitt Peak || Spacewatch || — || align=right | 3.4 km || 
|-id=968 bgcolor=#d6d6d6
| 299968 ||  || — || October 13, 2006 || Kitt Peak || Spacewatch || — || align=right | 3.7 km || 
|-id=969 bgcolor=#d6d6d6
| 299969 ||  || — || October 15, 2006 || Kitt Peak || Spacewatch || EOS || align=right | 2.2 km || 
|-id=970 bgcolor=#d6d6d6
| 299970 ||  || — || October 13, 2006 || Lulin Observatory || C.-S. Lin, Q.-z. Ye || HYG || align=right | 2.7 km || 
|-id=971 bgcolor=#d6d6d6
| 299971 ||  || — || October 12, 2006 || Kitt Peak || Spacewatch || — || align=right | 3.0 km || 
|-id=972 bgcolor=#d6d6d6
| 299972 ||  || — || October 12, 2006 || Palomar || NEAT || EOS || align=right | 2.9 km || 
|-id=973 bgcolor=#d6d6d6
| 299973 ||  || — || October 15, 2006 || Kitt Peak || Spacewatch || — || align=right | 3.0 km || 
|-id=974 bgcolor=#d6d6d6
| 299974 ||  || — || October 15, 2006 || Kitt Peak || Spacewatch || — || align=right | 2.9 km || 
|-id=975 bgcolor=#d6d6d6
| 299975 ||  || — || October 13, 2006 || Kitt Peak || Spacewatch || — || align=right | 3.4 km || 
|-id=976 bgcolor=#d6d6d6
| 299976 ||  || — || October 1, 2006 || Apache Point || A. C. Becker || — || align=right | 2.8 km || 
|-id=977 bgcolor=#d6d6d6
| 299977 ||  || — || October 1, 2006 || Apache Point || A. C. Becker || EOS || align=right | 2.3 km || 
|-id=978 bgcolor=#d6d6d6
| 299978 ||  || — || October 1, 2006 || Apache Point || A. C. Becker || — || align=right | 3.9 km || 
|-id=979 bgcolor=#d6d6d6
| 299979 ||  || — || October 11, 2006 || Apache Point || A. C. Becker || EUP || align=right | 3.9 km || 
|-id=980 bgcolor=#d6d6d6
| 299980 ||  || — || October 12, 2006 || Apache Point || A. C. Becker || — || align=right | 3.9 km || 
|-id=981 bgcolor=#d6d6d6
| 299981 ||  || — || October 2, 2006 || Mount Lemmon || Mount Lemmon Survey || VER || align=right | 2.6 km || 
|-id=982 bgcolor=#d6d6d6
| 299982 ||  || — || October 2, 2006 || Mount Lemmon || Mount Lemmon Survey || — || align=right | 3.5 km || 
|-id=983 bgcolor=#d6d6d6
| 299983 ||  || — || October 13, 2006 || Kitt Peak || Spacewatch || — || align=right | 2.3 km || 
|-id=984 bgcolor=#d6d6d6
| 299984 ||  || — || October 13, 2006 || Kitt Peak || Spacewatch || — || align=right | 1.7 km || 
|-id=985 bgcolor=#d6d6d6
| 299985 ||  || — || October 16, 2006 || Catalina || CSS || — || align=right | 4.1 km || 
|-id=986 bgcolor=#d6d6d6
| 299986 ||  || — || October 16, 2006 || Kitt Peak || Spacewatch || LIX || align=right | 4.3 km || 
|-id=987 bgcolor=#d6d6d6
| 299987 ||  || — || October 17, 2006 || Mount Lemmon || Mount Lemmon Survey || — || align=right | 3.1 km || 
|-id=988 bgcolor=#d6d6d6
| 299988 ||  || — || October 17, 2006 || Mount Lemmon || Mount Lemmon Survey || — || align=right | 2.6 km || 
|-id=989 bgcolor=#d6d6d6
| 299989 ||  || — || October 17, 2006 || Mount Lemmon || Mount Lemmon Survey || — || align=right | 2.5 km || 
|-id=990 bgcolor=#d6d6d6
| 299990 ||  || — || October 17, 2006 || Mount Lemmon || Mount Lemmon Survey || — || align=right | 4.3 km || 
|-id=991 bgcolor=#d6d6d6
| 299991 ||  || — || October 17, 2006 || Mount Lemmon || Mount Lemmon Survey || — || align=right | 3.9 km || 
|-id=992 bgcolor=#d6d6d6
| 299992 ||  || — || October 17, 2006 || Mount Lemmon || Mount Lemmon Survey || — || align=right | 3.4 km || 
|-id=993 bgcolor=#d6d6d6
| 299993 ||  || — || October 16, 2006 || Kitt Peak || Spacewatch || EOS || align=right | 1.9 km || 
|-id=994 bgcolor=#d6d6d6
| 299994 ||  || — || October 16, 2006 || Kitt Peak || Spacewatch || — || align=right | 1.9 km || 
|-id=995 bgcolor=#d6d6d6
| 299995 ||  || — || October 16, 2006 || Kitt Peak || Spacewatch || — || align=right | 2.4 km || 
|-id=996 bgcolor=#d6d6d6
| 299996 ||  || — || October 16, 2006 || Kitt Peak || Spacewatch || THM || align=right | 2.5 km || 
|-id=997 bgcolor=#d6d6d6
| 299997 ||  || — || October 16, 2006 || Kitt Peak || Spacewatch || — || align=right | 2.9 km || 
|-id=998 bgcolor=#d6d6d6
| 299998 ||  || — || October 16, 2006 || Kitt Peak || Spacewatch || — || align=right | 3.1 km || 
|-id=999 bgcolor=#d6d6d6
| 299999 ||  || — || October 16, 2006 || Kitt Peak || Spacewatch || EOS || align=right | 2.2 km || 
|-id=000 bgcolor=#d6d6d6
| 300000 ||  || — || October 16, 2006 || Kitt Peak || Spacewatch || THM || align=right | 2.0 km || 
|}

References

External links 
 Discovery Circumstances: Numbered Minor Planets (295001)–(300000) (IAU Minor Planet Center)

0299